

436001–436100 

|-bgcolor=#d6d6d6
| 436001 ||  || — || March 28, 2009 || Kitt Peak || Spacewatch || — || align=right | 2.8 km || 
|-id=002 bgcolor=#d6d6d6
| 436002 ||  || — || March 28, 2009 || Kitt Peak || Spacewatch || — || align=right | 2.9 km || 
|-id=003 bgcolor=#d6d6d6
| 436003 ||  || — || March 23, 2009 || Siding Spring || SSS || — || align=right | 4.5 km || 
|-id=004 bgcolor=#d6d6d6
| 436004 ||  || — || March 22, 2009 || Mount Lemmon || Mount Lemmon Survey || — || align=right | 2.3 km || 
|-id=005 bgcolor=#d6d6d6
| 436005 ||  || — || March 29, 2009 || Kitt Peak || Spacewatch || Tj (2.91) || align=right | 4.0 km || 
|-id=006 bgcolor=#d6d6d6
| 436006 ||  || — || March 24, 2009 || Mount Lemmon || Mount Lemmon Survey || EOS || align=right | 2.3 km || 
|-id=007 bgcolor=#d6d6d6
| 436007 ||  || — || April 13, 2009 || Altschwendt || W. Ries || LIX || align=right | 4.3 km || 
|-id=008 bgcolor=#d6d6d6
| 436008 ||  || — || April 2, 2009 || Kitt Peak || Spacewatch || URS || align=right | 3.7 km || 
|-id=009 bgcolor=#d6d6d6
| 436009 ||  || — || April 17, 2009 || Kitt Peak || Spacewatch || — || align=right | 3.3 km || 
|-id=010 bgcolor=#d6d6d6
| 436010 ||  || — || April 18, 2009 || Mount Lemmon || Mount Lemmon Survey || — || align=right | 3.6 km || 
|-id=011 bgcolor=#d6d6d6
| 436011 ||  || — || March 16, 2009 || Kitt Peak || Spacewatch || EOS || align=right | 1.8 km || 
|-id=012 bgcolor=#d6d6d6
| 436012 ||  || — || April 18, 2009 || Kitt Peak || Spacewatch || — || align=right | 2.5 km || 
|-id=013 bgcolor=#d6d6d6
| 436013 ||  || — || March 26, 2003 || Kitt Peak || Spacewatch || HYG || align=right | 2.7 km || 
|-id=014 bgcolor=#d6d6d6
| 436014 ||  || — || April 17, 2009 || Kitt Peak || Spacewatch || — || align=right | 3.4 km || 
|-id=015 bgcolor=#d6d6d6
| 436015 ||  || — || April 19, 2009 || Kitt Peak || Spacewatch || — || align=right | 3.1 km || 
|-id=016 bgcolor=#d6d6d6
| 436016 ||  || — || April 19, 2009 || Kitt Peak || Spacewatch || — || align=right | 2.6 km || 
|-id=017 bgcolor=#d6d6d6
| 436017 ||  || — || April 19, 2009 || Kitt Peak || Spacewatch || — || align=right | 3.4 km || 
|-id=018 bgcolor=#d6d6d6
| 436018 ||  || — || March 17, 2009 || Kitt Peak || Spacewatch || — || align=right | 2.7 km || 
|-id=019 bgcolor=#d6d6d6
| 436019 ||  || — || April 18, 2009 || Kitt Peak || Spacewatch || — || align=right | 3.6 km || 
|-id=020 bgcolor=#d6d6d6
| 436020 ||  || — || March 28, 2009 || Kitt Peak || Spacewatch || — || align=right | 2.7 km || 
|-id=021 bgcolor=#d6d6d6
| 436021 ||  || — || April 21, 2009 || Mount Lemmon || Mount Lemmon Survey || — || align=right | 3.4 km || 
|-id=022 bgcolor=#d6d6d6
| 436022 ||  || — || April 22, 2009 || Kitt Peak || Spacewatch || HYG || align=right | 2.5 km || 
|-id=023 bgcolor=#d6d6d6
| 436023 ||  || — || March 24, 2009 || Mount Lemmon || Mount Lemmon Survey || — || align=right | 3.0 km || 
|-id=024 bgcolor=#d6d6d6
| 436024 ||  || — || April 20, 2009 || Mount Lemmon || Mount Lemmon Survey || — || align=right | 3.4 km || 
|-id=025 bgcolor=#d6d6d6
| 436025 ||  || — || April 19, 2009 || Catalina || CSS || Tj (2.99) || align=right | 3.3 km || 
|-id=026 bgcolor=#d6d6d6
| 436026 ||  || — || March 29, 2009 || Kitt Peak || Spacewatch || — || align=right | 2.4 km || 
|-id=027 bgcolor=#d6d6d6
| 436027 ||  || — || March 2, 2009 || Mount Lemmon || Mount Lemmon Survey || EOS || align=right | 2.0 km || 
|-id=028 bgcolor=#d6d6d6
| 436028 ||  || — || April 21, 2009 || Catalina || CSS || Tj (2.95) || align=right | 3.6 km || 
|-id=029 bgcolor=#d6d6d6
| 436029 ||  || — || April 19, 2009 || Mount Lemmon || Mount Lemmon Survey || — || align=right | 3.2 km || 
|-id=030 bgcolor=#FFC2E0
| 436030 ||  || — || May 13, 2009 || Mount Lemmon || Mount Lemmon Survey || ATE || align=right data-sort-value="0.3" | 300 m || 
|-id=031 bgcolor=#d6d6d6
| 436031 ||  || — || February 20, 2009 || Mount Lemmon || Mount Lemmon Survey || — || align=right | 4.8 km || 
|-id=032 bgcolor=#d6d6d6
| 436032 ||  || — || May 14, 2009 || Kitt Peak || Spacewatch || — || align=right | 5.1 km || 
|-id=033 bgcolor=#d6d6d6
| 436033 ||  || — || May 25, 2009 || Kitt Peak || Spacewatch || 7:4 || align=right | 5.6 km || 
|-id=034 bgcolor=#d6d6d6
| 436034 ||  || — || May 26, 2009 || Kitt Peak || Spacewatch || — || align=right | 2.9 km || 
|-id=035 bgcolor=#FFC2E0
| 436035 ||  || — || May 31, 2009 || Cerro Burek || Alianza S4 Obs. || AMOcritical || align=right data-sort-value="0.36" | 360 m || 
|-id=036 bgcolor=#FA8072
| 436036 ||  || — || June 27, 2009 || Catalina || CSS || — || align=right | 1.2 km || 
|-id=037 bgcolor=#FFC2E0
| 436037 || 2009 NJ || — || July 11, 2009 || La Sagra || OAM Obs. || APO || align=right data-sort-value="0.65" | 650 m || 
|-id=038 bgcolor=#fefefe
| 436038 ||  || — || July 27, 2009 || La Sagra || OAM Obs. || — || align=right data-sort-value="0.72" | 720 m || 
|-id=039 bgcolor=#fefefe
| 436039 ||  || — || July 27, 2009 || Kitt Peak || Spacewatch || — || align=right data-sort-value="0.79" | 790 m || 
|-id=040 bgcolor=#fefefe
| 436040 || 2009 PO || — || August 12, 2009 || Dauban || F. Kugel || — || align=right data-sort-value="0.74" | 740 m || 
|-id=041 bgcolor=#fefefe
| 436041 ||  || — || June 24, 2009 || Mount Lemmon || Mount Lemmon Survey || — || align=right data-sort-value="0.70" | 700 m || 
|-id=042 bgcolor=#fefefe
| 436042 ||  || — || August 15, 2009 || Catalina || CSS || — || align=right data-sort-value="0.57" | 570 m || 
|-id=043 bgcolor=#fefefe
| 436043 ||  || — || August 15, 2009 || Catalina || CSS || — || align=right data-sort-value="0.75" | 750 m || 
|-id=044 bgcolor=#fefefe
| 436044 ||  || — || August 15, 2009 || Catalina || CSS || — || align=right data-sort-value="0.73" | 730 m || 
|-id=045 bgcolor=#fefefe
| 436045 ||  || — || August 15, 2009 || Kitt Peak || Spacewatch || — || align=right data-sort-value="0.74" | 740 m || 
|-id=046 bgcolor=#fefefe
| 436046 ||  || — || August 17, 2009 || Kitt Peak || Spacewatch || — || align=right data-sort-value="0.90" | 900 m || 
|-id=047 bgcolor=#fefefe
| 436047 ||  || — || August 19, 2009 || La Sagra || OAM Obs. || — || align=right data-sort-value="0.82" | 820 m || 
|-id=048 bgcolor=#fefefe
| 436048 Fritzhuber ||  ||  || August 20, 2009 || Gaisberg || R. Gierlinger || — || align=right data-sort-value="0.67" | 670 m || 
|-id=049 bgcolor=#fefefe
| 436049 ||  || — || August 24, 2009 || Andrushivka || Andrushivka Obs. || — || align=right data-sort-value="0.83" | 830 m || 
|-id=050 bgcolor=#fefefe
| 436050 ||  || — || August 26, 2009 || La Sagra || OAM Obs. || — || align=right data-sort-value="0.71" | 710 m || 
|-id=051 bgcolor=#fefefe
| 436051 ||  || — || August 26, 2009 || La Sagra || OAM Obs. || — || align=right data-sort-value="0.97" | 970 m || 
|-id=052 bgcolor=#fefefe
| 436052 ||  || — || August 19, 2009 || Kitt Peak || Spacewatch || V || align=right data-sort-value="0.70" | 700 m || 
|-id=053 bgcolor=#fefefe
| 436053 ||  || — || September 14, 2009 || Dauban || F. Kugel || — || align=right | 1.0 km || 
|-id=054 bgcolor=#fefefe
| 436054 ||  || — || September 12, 2009 || Kitt Peak || Spacewatch || V || align=right data-sort-value="0.62" | 620 m || 
|-id=055 bgcolor=#fefefe
| 436055 ||  || — || September 13, 2009 || Socorro || LINEAR || — || align=right data-sort-value="0.77" | 770 m || 
|-id=056 bgcolor=#fefefe
| 436056 ||  || — || August 18, 2009 || Kitt Peak || Spacewatch || — || align=right data-sort-value="0.74" | 740 m || 
|-id=057 bgcolor=#C2FFFF
| 436057 ||  || — || September 3, 2008 || Kitt Peak || Spacewatch || L4 || align=right | 7.4 km || 
|-id=058 bgcolor=#fefefe
| 436058 ||  || — || September 15, 2009 || Kitt Peak || Spacewatch || — || align=right | 1.1 km || 
|-id=059 bgcolor=#fefefe
| 436059 ||  || — || September 15, 2009 || Kitt Peak || Spacewatch || V || align=right data-sort-value="0.62" | 620 m || 
|-id=060 bgcolor=#fefefe
| 436060 ||  || — || November 20, 2006 || Kitt Peak || Spacewatch || — || align=right data-sort-value="0.83" | 830 m || 
|-id=061 bgcolor=#C2FFFF
| 436061 ||  || — || September 15, 2009 || Kitt Peak || Spacewatch || L4 || align=right | 6.8 km || 
|-id=062 bgcolor=#fefefe
| 436062 ||  || — || September 15, 2009 || Kitt Peak || Spacewatch || V || align=right data-sort-value="0.56" | 560 m || 
|-id=063 bgcolor=#FA8072
| 436063 ||  || — || September 11, 2009 || Catalina || CSS || — || align=right data-sort-value="0.98" | 980 m || 
|-id=064 bgcolor=#C2FFFF
| 436064 ||  || — || September 3, 2008 || Kitt Peak || Spacewatch || L4 || align=right | 7.1 km || 
|-id=065 bgcolor=#C2FFFF
| 436065 ||  || — || September 15, 2009 || Kitt Peak || Spacewatch || L4 || align=right | 8.6 km || 
|-id=066 bgcolor=#C2FFFF
| 436066 ||  || — || September 15, 2009 || Kitt Peak || Spacewatch || L4 || align=right | 7.0 km || 
|-id=067 bgcolor=#fefefe
| 436067 ||  || — || August 20, 2009 || Kitt Peak || Spacewatch || — || align=right | 1.0 km || 
|-id=068 bgcolor=#fefefe
| 436068 ||  || — || September 16, 2009 || Kitt Peak || Spacewatch || — || align=right data-sort-value="0.67" | 670 m || 
|-id=069 bgcolor=#C2FFFF
| 436069 ||  || — || September 16, 2009 || Kitt Peak || Spacewatch || L4 || align=right | 13 km || 
|-id=070 bgcolor=#fefefe
| 436070 ||  || — || September 17, 2009 || Kitt Peak || Spacewatch || — || align=right data-sort-value="0.98" | 980 m || 
|-id=071 bgcolor=#fefefe
| 436071 ||  || — || September 17, 2009 || Mount Lemmon || Mount Lemmon Survey || — || align=right data-sort-value="0.83" | 830 m || 
|-id=072 bgcolor=#C2FFFF
| 436072 ||  || — || September 20, 2009 || Kitt Peak || Spacewatch || L4 || align=right | 8.5 km || 
|-id=073 bgcolor=#FA8072
| 436073 ||  || — || September 18, 2009 || Catalina || CSS || — || align=right data-sort-value="0.87" | 870 m || 
|-id=074 bgcolor=#fefefe
| 436074 ||  || — || September 18, 2009 || Kitt Peak || Spacewatch || V || align=right data-sort-value="0.64" | 640 m || 
|-id=075 bgcolor=#C2FFFF
| 436075 ||  || — || September 18, 2009 || Kitt Peak || Spacewatch || L4 || align=right | 8.4 km || 
|-id=076 bgcolor=#fefefe
| 436076 ||  || — || September 18, 2009 || Kitt Peak || Spacewatch || — || align=right data-sort-value="0.79" | 790 m || 
|-id=077 bgcolor=#fefefe
| 436077 ||  || — || September 18, 2009 || Kitt Peak || Spacewatch || — || align=right data-sort-value="0.68" | 680 m || 
|-id=078 bgcolor=#fefefe
| 436078 ||  || — || September 18, 2009 || Kitt Peak || Spacewatch || — || align=right data-sort-value="0.86" | 860 m || 
|-id=079 bgcolor=#fefefe
| 436079 ||  || — || September 18, 2009 || Kitt Peak || Spacewatch || — || align=right data-sort-value="0.80" | 800 m || 
|-id=080 bgcolor=#fefefe
| 436080 ||  || — || September 18, 2009 || Kitt Peak || Spacewatch || — || align=right data-sort-value="0.79" | 790 m || 
|-id=081 bgcolor=#fefefe
| 436081 ||  || — || September 20, 2009 || Kitt Peak || Spacewatch || — || align=right data-sort-value="0.69" | 690 m || 
|-id=082 bgcolor=#C2FFFF
| 436082 ||  || — || September 20, 2009 || Kitt Peak || Spacewatch || L4 || align=right | 7.2 km || 
|-id=083 bgcolor=#fefefe
| 436083 ||  || — || September 20, 2009 || Kitt Peak || Spacewatch || — || align=right data-sort-value="0.95" | 950 m || 
|-id=084 bgcolor=#C2FFFF
| 436084 ||  || — || September 20, 2009 || Kitt Peak || Spacewatch || L4 || align=right | 7.3 km || 
|-id=085 bgcolor=#C2FFFF
| 436085 ||  || — || September 9, 2008 || Mount Lemmon || Mount Lemmon Survey || L4 || align=right | 7.2 km || 
|-id=086 bgcolor=#d6d6d6
| 436086 ||  || — || September 21, 2009 || Mount Lemmon || Mount Lemmon Survey || 3:2 || align=right | 3.8 km || 
|-id=087 bgcolor=#fefefe
| 436087 ||  || — || September 21, 2009 || Kitt Peak || Spacewatch || — || align=right data-sort-value="0.85" | 850 m || 
|-id=088 bgcolor=#fefefe
| 436088 ||  || — || August 30, 2005 || Kitt Peak || Spacewatch || V || align=right data-sort-value="0.58" | 580 m || 
|-id=089 bgcolor=#d6d6d6
| 436089 ||  || — || April 25, 2007 || Kitt Peak || Spacewatch || 3:2 || align=right | 4.2 km || 
|-id=090 bgcolor=#d6d6d6
| 436090 ||  || — || September 17, 2009 || Kitt Peak || Spacewatch || 3:2 || align=right | 5.1 km || 
|-id=091 bgcolor=#fefefe
| 436091 ||  || — || September 23, 2009 || Kitt Peak || Spacewatch || — || align=right data-sort-value="0.71" | 710 m || 
|-id=092 bgcolor=#fefefe
| 436092 ||  || — || September 23, 2009 || Kitt Peak || Spacewatch || NYS || align=right data-sort-value="0.69" | 690 m || 
|-id=093 bgcolor=#fefefe
| 436093 ||  || — || September 23, 2009 || Kitt Peak || Spacewatch || — || align=right data-sort-value="0.77" | 770 m || 
|-id=094 bgcolor=#FFC2E0
| 436094 ||  || — || September 29, 2009 || Socorro || LINEAR || AMOcritical || align=right data-sort-value="0.56" | 560 m || 
|-id=095 bgcolor=#fefefe
| 436095 ||  || — || September 25, 2009 || Kitt Peak || Spacewatch || — || align=right data-sort-value="0.64" | 640 m || 
|-id=096 bgcolor=#fefefe
| 436096 ||  || — || September 21, 2009 || Kitt Peak || Spacewatch || — || align=right data-sort-value="0.72" | 720 m || 
|-id=097 bgcolor=#C2FFFF
| 436097 ||  || — || September 17, 2009 || Kitt Peak || Spacewatch || L4 || align=right | 9.6 km || 
|-id=098 bgcolor=#fefefe
| 436098 ||  || — || September 20, 2009 || Kitt Peak || Spacewatch || — || align=right data-sort-value="0.85" | 850 m || 
|-id=099 bgcolor=#fefefe
| 436099 ||  || — || September 22, 2009 || Mount Lemmon || Mount Lemmon Survey || — || align=right data-sort-value="0.85" | 850 m || 
|-id=100 bgcolor=#fefefe
| 436100 ||  || — || September 23, 2009 || Mount Lemmon || Mount Lemmon Survey || — || align=right | 1.9 km || 
|}

436101–436200 

|-bgcolor=#C2FFFF
| 436101 ||  || — || September 24, 2009 || Kitt Peak || Spacewatch || L4 || align=right | 6.5 km || 
|-id=102 bgcolor=#fefefe
| 436102 ||  || — || September 17, 2009 || Kitt Peak || Spacewatch || — || align=right data-sort-value="0.72" | 720 m || 
|-id=103 bgcolor=#fefefe
| 436103 ||  || — || September 17, 2009 || Kitt Peak || Spacewatch || V || align=right data-sort-value="0.70" | 700 m || 
|-id=104 bgcolor=#fefefe
| 436104 ||  || — || September 15, 2009 || Kitt Peak || Spacewatch || — || align=right data-sort-value="0.59" | 590 m || 
|-id=105 bgcolor=#fefefe
| 436105 ||  || — || September 17, 2009 || Kitt Peak || Spacewatch || MAS || align=right data-sort-value="0.71" | 710 m || 
|-id=106 bgcolor=#fefefe
| 436106 ||  || — || August 28, 2009 || Kitt Peak || Spacewatch || — || align=right data-sort-value="0.80" | 800 m || 
|-id=107 bgcolor=#C2FFFF
| 436107 ||  || — || September 20, 2009 || Kitt Peak || Spacewatch || L4 || align=right | 7.3 km || 
|-id=108 bgcolor=#C2FFFF
| 436108 ||  || — || September 21, 2009 || Kitt Peak || Spacewatch || L4 || align=right | 7.2 km || 
|-id=109 bgcolor=#fefefe
| 436109 ||  || — || September 23, 2009 || Mount Lemmon || Mount Lemmon Survey || — || align=right | 1.5 km || 
|-id=110 bgcolor=#fefefe
| 436110 ||  || — || September 22, 2009 || Kitt Peak || Spacewatch || — || align=right data-sort-value="0.64" | 640 m || 
|-id=111 bgcolor=#fefefe
| 436111 ||  || — || September 16, 2009 || Catalina || CSS || — || align=right data-sort-value="0.88" | 880 m || 
|-id=112 bgcolor=#d6d6d6
| 436112 ||  || — || September 23, 2009 || Kitt Peak || Spacewatch || 3:2 || align=right | 4.0 km || 
|-id=113 bgcolor=#C2FFFF
| 436113 ||  || — || September 28, 2009 || Mount Lemmon || Mount Lemmon Survey || L4 || align=right | 9.2 km || 
|-id=114 bgcolor=#fefefe
| 436114 ||  || — || September 27, 2009 || Catalina || CSS || — || align=right data-sort-value="0.86" | 860 m || 
|-id=115 bgcolor=#fefefe
| 436115 ||  || — || October 10, 2009 || La Sagra || OAM Obs. || — || align=right data-sort-value="0.85" | 850 m || 
|-id=116 bgcolor=#FFC2E0
| 436116 ||  || — || October 12, 2009 || Mount Lemmon || Mount Lemmon Survey || AMO || align=right data-sort-value="0.20" | 200 m || 
|-id=117 bgcolor=#fefefe
| 436117 ||  || — || March 12, 2008 || Kitt Peak || Spacewatch || (2076) || align=right data-sort-value="0.82" | 820 m || 
|-id=118 bgcolor=#fefefe
| 436118 ||  || — || October 13, 2009 || La Sagra || OAM Obs. || — || align=right data-sort-value="0.74" | 740 m || 
|-id=119 bgcolor=#fefefe
| 436119 ||  || — || October 11, 2009 || La Sagra || OAM Obs. || — || align=right data-sort-value="0.72" | 720 m || 
|-id=120 bgcolor=#fefefe
| 436120 ||  || — || January 27, 2003 || Socorro || LINEAR || — || align=right | 1.1 km || 
|-id=121 bgcolor=#fefefe
| 436121 ||  || — || October 14, 2009 || La Sagra || OAM Obs. || — || align=right data-sort-value="0.94" | 940 m || 
|-id=122 bgcolor=#fefefe
| 436122 ||  || — || October 14, 2009 || Purple Mountain || PMO NEO || — || align=right data-sort-value="0.68" | 680 m || 
|-id=123 bgcolor=#fefefe
| 436123 ||  || — || October 15, 2009 || Mount Lemmon || Mount Lemmon Survey || V || align=right data-sort-value="0.55" | 550 m || 
|-id=124 bgcolor=#C2FFFF
| 436124 ||  || — || September 25, 2009 || Kitt Peak || Spacewatch || L4 || align=right | 7.1 km || 
|-id=125 bgcolor=#fefefe
| 436125 ||  || — || November 11, 2006 || Kitt Peak || Spacewatch || — || align=right data-sort-value="0.65" | 650 m || 
|-id=126 bgcolor=#fefefe
| 436126 ||  || — || October 10, 2009 || La Sagra || OAM Obs. || — || align=right | 2.0 km || 
|-id=127 bgcolor=#fefefe
| 436127 ||  || — || October 15, 2009 || La Sagra || OAM Obs. || V || align=right data-sort-value="0.71" | 710 m || 
|-id=128 bgcolor=#fefefe
| 436128 ||  || — || October 15, 2009 || Catalina || CSS || — || align=right | 1.7 km || 
|-id=129 bgcolor=#fefefe
| 436129 ||  || — || October 11, 2009 || Mount Lemmon || Mount Lemmon Survey || — || align=right data-sort-value="0.80" | 800 m || 
|-id=130 bgcolor=#fefefe
| 436130 ||  || — || September 28, 2009 || Mount Lemmon || Mount Lemmon Survey || — || align=right data-sort-value="0.67" | 670 m || 
|-id=131 bgcolor=#C2FFFF
| 436131 ||  || — || September 28, 2009 || Mount Lemmon || Mount Lemmon Survey || L4 || align=right | 6.5 km || 
|-id=132 bgcolor=#fefefe
| 436132 ||  || — || October 18, 2009 || Hibiscus || N. Teamo || V || align=right data-sort-value="0.61" | 610 m || 
|-id=133 bgcolor=#fefefe
| 436133 ||  || — || October 20, 2009 || Bisei SG Center || BATTeRS || — || align=right data-sort-value="0.80" | 800 m || 
|-id=134 bgcolor=#fefefe
| 436134 ||  || — || October 22, 2009 || Sierra Stars || Sierra Stars Obs. || — || align=right data-sort-value="0.84" | 840 m || 
|-id=135 bgcolor=#fefefe
| 436135 ||  || — || September 19, 2009 || Catalina || CSS || — || align=right data-sort-value="0.91" | 910 m || 
|-id=136 bgcolor=#fefefe
| 436136 ||  || — || October 21, 2009 || Catalina || CSS || NYSfast? || align=right data-sort-value="0.68" | 680 m || 
|-id=137 bgcolor=#fefefe
| 436137 ||  || — || October 18, 2009 || Mount Lemmon || Mount Lemmon Survey || — || align=right data-sort-value="0.83" | 830 m || 
|-id=138 bgcolor=#fefefe
| 436138 ||  || — || October 22, 2009 || Mount Lemmon || Mount Lemmon Survey || — || align=right data-sort-value="0.74" | 740 m || 
|-id=139 bgcolor=#C2FFFF
| 436139 ||  || — || October 22, 2009 || Mount Lemmon || Mount Lemmon Survey || L4 || align=right | 9.6 km || 
|-id=140 bgcolor=#C2FFFF
| 436140 ||  || — || October 23, 2009 || Mount Lemmon || Mount Lemmon Survey || L4 || align=right | 11 km || 
|-id=141 bgcolor=#fefefe
| 436141 ||  || — || October 22, 2009 || Mount Lemmon || Mount Lemmon Survey || — || align=right data-sort-value="0.66" | 660 m || 
|-id=142 bgcolor=#C2FFFF
| 436142 ||  || — || September 18, 2009 || Kitt Peak || Spacewatch || L4 || align=right | 8.3 km || 
|-id=143 bgcolor=#C2FFFF
| 436143 ||  || — || October 22, 2009 || Mount Lemmon || Mount Lemmon Survey || L4 || align=right | 8.1 km || 
|-id=144 bgcolor=#fefefe
| 436144 ||  || — || September 22, 2009 || Mount Lemmon || Mount Lemmon Survey || — || align=right data-sort-value="0.83" | 830 m || 
|-id=145 bgcolor=#fefefe
| 436145 ||  || — || October 23, 2009 || Mount Lemmon || Mount Lemmon Survey || — || align=right data-sort-value="0.96" | 960 m || 
|-id=146 bgcolor=#C2FFFF
| 436146 ||  || — || October 23, 2009 || Mount Lemmon || Mount Lemmon Survey || L4 || align=right | 6.9 km || 
|-id=147 bgcolor=#fefefe
| 436147 ||  || — || October 21, 2009 || Catalina || CSS || — || align=right | 1.1 km || 
|-id=148 bgcolor=#fefefe
| 436148 ||  || — || August 31, 2005 || Kitt Peak || Spacewatch || NYS || align=right data-sort-value="0.63" | 630 m || 
|-id=149 bgcolor=#fefefe
| 436149 Edabel || 2009 VL ||  || November 7, 2009 || CBA-NOVAC || D. R. Skillman || — || align=right data-sort-value="0.98" | 980 m || 
|-id=150 bgcolor=#E9E9E9
| 436150 ||  || — || November 8, 2009 || Mount Lemmon || Mount Lemmon Survey || — || align=right data-sort-value="0.78" | 780 m || 
|-id=151 bgcolor=#C2FFFF
| 436151 ||  || — || September 29, 2008 || Kitt Peak || Spacewatch || L4 || align=right | 7.1 km || 
|-id=152 bgcolor=#fefefe
| 436152 ||  || — || October 24, 2009 || Kitt Peak || Spacewatch || — || align=right data-sort-value="0.79" | 790 m || 
|-id=153 bgcolor=#fefefe
| 436153 ||  || — || September 22, 2009 || Mount Lemmon || Mount Lemmon Survey || — || align=right data-sort-value="0.88" | 880 m || 
|-id=154 bgcolor=#E9E9E9
| 436154 ||  || — || November 9, 2009 || Kitt Peak || Spacewatch || (5) || align=right data-sort-value="0.72" | 720 m || 
|-id=155 bgcolor=#fefefe
| 436155 ||  || — || October 22, 2009 || Catalina || CSS || — || align=right | 1.0 km || 
|-id=156 bgcolor=#d6d6d6
| 436156 ||  || — || November 8, 2009 || Kitt Peak || Spacewatch || 3:2 || align=right | 4.8 km || 
|-id=157 bgcolor=#C2FFFF
| 436157 ||  || — || November 8, 2009 || Catalina || CSS || L4 || align=right | 10 km || 
|-id=158 bgcolor=#fefefe
| 436158 ||  || — || November 9, 2009 || Kitt Peak || Spacewatch || — || align=right data-sort-value="0.87" | 870 m || 
|-id=159 bgcolor=#fefefe
| 436159 ||  || — || October 30, 2009 || Mount Lemmon || Mount Lemmon Survey || — || align=right data-sort-value="0.96" | 960 m || 
|-id=160 bgcolor=#fefefe
| 436160 ||  || — || November 8, 2009 || Mount Lemmon || Mount Lemmon Survey || — || align=right data-sort-value="0.78" | 780 m || 
|-id=161 bgcolor=#fefefe
| 436161 ||  || — || November 11, 2009 || La Sagra || OAM Obs. || — || align=right data-sort-value="0.81" | 810 m || 
|-id=162 bgcolor=#E9E9E9
| 436162 ||  || — || November 10, 2009 || Catalina || CSS || — || align=right | 3.1 km || 
|-id=163 bgcolor=#FA8072
| 436163 ||  || — || September 26, 2009 || Socorro || LINEAR || — || align=right | 1.3 km || 
|-id=164 bgcolor=#E9E9E9
| 436164 ||  || — || November 8, 2009 || Kitt Peak || Spacewatch || — || align=right | 1.0 km || 
|-id=165 bgcolor=#fefefe
| 436165 ||  || — || November 18, 1998 || Kitt Peak || Spacewatch || — || align=right data-sort-value="0.83" | 830 m || 
|-id=166 bgcolor=#fefefe
| 436166 ||  || — || September 21, 2009 || Mount Lemmon || Mount Lemmon Survey || — || align=right data-sort-value="0.85" | 850 m || 
|-id=167 bgcolor=#E9E9E9
| 436167 ||  || — || November 10, 2009 || Catalina || CSS || — || align=right | 2.5 km || 
|-id=168 bgcolor=#fefefe
| 436168 ||  || — || October 17, 2009 || Mount Lemmon || Mount Lemmon Survey || — || align=right | 1.1 km || 
|-id=169 bgcolor=#fefefe
| 436169 ||  || — || October 11, 1991 || Kitt Peak || Spacewatch || — || align=right data-sort-value="0.87" | 870 m || 
|-id=170 bgcolor=#fefefe
| 436170 ||  || — || November 9, 2009 || Kitt Peak || Spacewatch || MAS || align=right data-sort-value="0.81" | 810 m || 
|-id=171 bgcolor=#E9E9E9
| 436171 ||  || — || November 11, 2009 || Kitt Peak || Spacewatch || (5) || align=right data-sort-value="0.82" | 820 m || 
|-id=172 bgcolor=#fefefe
| 436172 ||  || — || November 9, 2009 || La Sagra || OAM Obs. || — || align=right | 1.9 km || 
|-id=173 bgcolor=#E9E9E9
| 436173 ||  || — || September 21, 2009 || Mount Lemmon || Mount Lemmon Survey || — || align=right | 1.6 km || 
|-id=174 bgcolor=#E9E9E9
| 436174 ||  || — || November 11, 2009 || Mount Lemmon || Mount Lemmon Survey || — || align=right | 1.5 km || 
|-id=175 bgcolor=#E9E9E9
| 436175 ||  || — || November 19, 2009 || Mount Lemmon || Mount Lemmon Survey || — || align=right | 1.9 km || 
|-id=176 bgcolor=#fefefe
| 436176 ||  || — || November 18, 2009 || Socorro || LINEAR || — || align=right data-sort-value="0.99" | 990 m || 
|-id=177 bgcolor=#fefefe
| 436177 ||  || — || November 17, 2009 || Catalina || CSS || — || align=right | 1.2 km || 
|-id=178 bgcolor=#fefefe
| 436178 ||  || — || November 17, 2009 || Kitt Peak || Spacewatch || — || align=right | 1.0 km || 
|-id=179 bgcolor=#E9E9E9
| 436179 ||  || — || November 17, 2009 || Mount Lemmon || Mount Lemmon Survey || — || align=right | 2.5 km || 
|-id=180 bgcolor=#E9E9E9
| 436180 ||  || — || November 18, 2009 || Kitt Peak || Spacewatch || (5) || align=right data-sort-value="0.66" | 660 m || 
|-id=181 bgcolor=#E9E9E9
| 436181 ||  || — || November 16, 2009 || Mount Lemmon || Mount Lemmon Survey || — || align=right data-sort-value="0.77" | 770 m || 
|-id=182 bgcolor=#E9E9E9
| 436182 ||  || — || November 26, 2005 || Kitt Peak || Spacewatch || — || align=right data-sort-value="0.64" | 640 m || 
|-id=183 bgcolor=#fefefe
| 436183 ||  || — || November 17, 2009 || Kitt Peak || Spacewatch || — || align=right data-sort-value="0.76" | 760 m || 
|-id=184 bgcolor=#fefefe
| 436184 ||  || — || November 17, 2009 || Kitt Peak || Spacewatch || — || align=right | 1.1 km || 
|-id=185 bgcolor=#E9E9E9
| 436185 ||  || — || November 10, 2009 || Kitt Peak || Spacewatch || — || align=right | 1.5 km || 
|-id=186 bgcolor=#E9E9E9
| 436186 ||  || — || November 9, 2009 || Catalina || CSS || — || align=right | 2.8 km || 
|-id=187 bgcolor=#E9E9E9
| 436187 ||  || — || November 18, 2009 || Kitt Peak || Spacewatch || — || align=right | 1.2 km || 
|-id=188 bgcolor=#E9E9E9
| 436188 ||  || — || November 17, 2009 || Mount Lemmon || Mount Lemmon Survey || EUN || align=right | 1.1 km || 
|-id=189 bgcolor=#E9E9E9
| 436189 ||  || — || November 18, 2009 || Kitt Peak || Spacewatch || — || align=right | 1.1 km || 
|-id=190 bgcolor=#E9E9E9
| 436190 ||  || — || November 19, 2009 || Kitt Peak || Spacewatch || — || align=right | 1.6 km || 
|-id=191 bgcolor=#fefefe
| 436191 ||  || — || November 17, 2009 || Mount Lemmon || Mount Lemmon Survey || V || align=right data-sort-value="0.62" | 620 m || 
|-id=192 bgcolor=#fefefe
| 436192 ||  || — || November 20, 2009 || Kitt Peak || Spacewatch || — || align=right | 2.8 km || 
|-id=193 bgcolor=#E9E9E9
| 436193 ||  || — || November 20, 2009 || Kitt Peak || Spacewatch || (5) || align=right data-sort-value="0.86" | 860 m || 
|-id=194 bgcolor=#E9E9E9
| 436194 ||  || — || November 20, 2009 || Kitt Peak || Spacewatch || — || align=right data-sort-value="0.91" | 910 m || 
|-id=195 bgcolor=#E9E9E9
| 436195 ||  || — || November 22, 2009 || Catalina || CSS || — || align=right data-sort-value="0.94" | 940 m || 
|-id=196 bgcolor=#fefefe
| 436196 ||  || — || November 21, 2009 || Kitt Peak || Spacewatch || — || align=right data-sort-value="0.78" | 780 m || 
|-id=197 bgcolor=#E9E9E9
| 436197 ||  || — || November 21, 2009 || Mount Lemmon || Mount Lemmon Survey || — || align=right | 1.7 km || 
|-id=198 bgcolor=#fefefe
| 436198 ||  || — || November 22, 2009 || Kitt Peak || Spacewatch || — || align=right data-sort-value="0.81" | 810 m || 
|-id=199 bgcolor=#E9E9E9
| 436199 ||  || — || September 18, 2009 || Mount Lemmon || Mount Lemmon Survey || — || align=right | 1.5 km || 
|-id=200 bgcolor=#E9E9E9
| 436200 ||  || — || November 23, 2009 || Kitt Peak || Spacewatch || — || align=right | 3.8 km || 
|}

436201–436300 

|-bgcolor=#fefefe
| 436201 ||  || — || November 24, 2009 || Mount Lemmon || Mount Lemmon Survey || — || align=right data-sort-value="0.87" | 870 m || 
|-id=202 bgcolor=#fefefe
| 436202 ||  || — || November 17, 2009 || Kitt Peak || Spacewatch || — || align=right data-sort-value="0.88" | 880 m || 
|-id=203 bgcolor=#C2FFFF
| 436203 ||  || — || November 17, 2009 || Mount Lemmon || Mount Lemmon Survey || L4 || align=right | 7.4 km || 
|-id=204 bgcolor=#C2FFFF
| 436204 ||  || — || November 23, 2009 || Kitt Peak || Spacewatch || L4 || align=right | 12 km || 
|-id=205 bgcolor=#fefefe
| 436205 ||  || — || September 19, 2009 || Mount Lemmon || Mount Lemmon Survey || — || align=right data-sort-value="0.81" | 810 m || 
|-id=206 bgcolor=#fefefe
| 436206 ||  || — || November 17, 2009 || Kitt Peak || Spacewatch || — || align=right | 1.8 km || 
|-id=207 bgcolor=#E9E9E9
| 436207 ||  || — || November 21, 2009 || Kitt Peak || Spacewatch || — || align=right | 1.3 km || 
|-id=208 bgcolor=#E9E9E9
| 436208 ||  || — || December 11, 2009 || Mount Lemmon || Mount Lemmon Survey || AGN || align=right | 1.1 km || 
|-id=209 bgcolor=#E9E9E9
| 436209 ||  || — || December 15, 2009 || Mount Lemmon || Mount Lemmon Survey || — || align=right | 1.6 km || 
|-id=210 bgcolor=#E9E9E9
| 436210 ||  || — || December 15, 2009 || Mount Lemmon || Mount Lemmon Survey || — || align=right | 2.2 km || 
|-id=211 bgcolor=#E9E9E9
| 436211 ||  || — || December 15, 2009 || Mount Lemmon || Mount Lemmon Survey || — || align=right | 2.6 km || 
|-id=212 bgcolor=#E9E9E9
| 436212 ||  || — || December 15, 2009 || Mount Lemmon || Mount Lemmon Survey || — || align=right | 1.8 km || 
|-id=213 bgcolor=#E9E9E9
| 436213 ||  || — || December 15, 2009 || Mount Lemmon || Mount Lemmon Survey || — || align=right | 1.2 km || 
|-id=214 bgcolor=#E9E9E9
| 436214 ||  || — || December 13, 2009 || Haleakala || M. Micheli || — || align=right data-sort-value="0.82" | 820 m || 
|-id=215 bgcolor=#E9E9E9
| 436215 ||  || — || December 15, 2009 || Mount Lemmon || Mount Lemmon Survey || — || align=right | 1.1 km || 
|-id=216 bgcolor=#E9E9E9
| 436216 || 2009 YD || — || December 16, 2009 || Tiki || N. Teamo || (5) || align=right data-sort-value="0.88" | 880 m || 
|-id=217 bgcolor=#fefefe
| 436217 ||  || — || December 16, 2009 || Mount Lemmon || Mount Lemmon Survey || — || align=right | 1.1 km || 
|-id=218 bgcolor=#E9E9E9
| 436218 ||  || — || November 17, 2009 || Mount Lemmon || Mount Lemmon Survey || — || align=right | 2.0 km || 
|-id=219 bgcolor=#E9E9E9
| 436219 ||  || — || November 16, 2009 || Mount Lemmon || Mount Lemmon Survey || — || align=right | 1.2 km || 
|-id=220 bgcolor=#E9E9E9
| 436220 ||  || — || January 6, 2010 || Mount Lemmon || Mount Lemmon Survey || — || align=right data-sort-value="0.84" | 840 m || 
|-id=221 bgcolor=#E9E9E9
| 436221 ||  || — || January 6, 2010 || Catalina || CSS || — || align=right | 1.5 km || 
|-id=222 bgcolor=#E9E9E9
| 436222 ||  || — || January 7, 2010 || Mount Lemmon || Mount Lemmon Survey || — || align=right | 2.2 km || 
|-id=223 bgcolor=#E9E9E9
| 436223 ||  || — || November 21, 2009 || Mount Lemmon || Mount Lemmon Survey || — || align=right | 2.0 km || 
|-id=224 bgcolor=#E9E9E9
| 436224 ||  || — || January 6, 2010 || Kitt Peak || Spacewatch || — || align=right | 1.3 km || 
|-id=225 bgcolor=#E9E9E9
| 436225 ||  || — || January 6, 2010 || Kitt Peak || Spacewatch || — || align=right | 2.3 km || 
|-id=226 bgcolor=#E9E9E9
| 436226 ||  || — || January 7, 2010 || Kitt Peak || Spacewatch || PAD || align=right | 1.8 km || 
|-id=227 bgcolor=#E9E9E9
| 436227 ||  || — || November 21, 2009 || Mount Lemmon || Mount Lemmon Survey || — || align=right | 1.4 km || 
|-id=228 bgcolor=#E9E9E9
| 436228 ||  || — || January 6, 2010 || Kitt Peak || Spacewatch || — || align=right | 1.2 km || 
|-id=229 bgcolor=#fefefe
| 436229 ||  || — || March 9, 2003 || Kitt Peak || Spacewatch || — || align=right | 1.1 km || 
|-id=230 bgcolor=#E9E9E9
| 436230 ||  || — || December 18, 2004 || Mount Lemmon || Mount Lemmon Survey || — || align=right | 1.5 km || 
|-id=231 bgcolor=#E9E9E9
| 436231 ||  || — || January 8, 2010 || Kitt Peak || Spacewatch || — || align=right | 2.9 km || 
|-id=232 bgcolor=#E9E9E9
| 436232 ||  || — || December 26, 2009 || Kitt Peak || Spacewatch || — || align=right | 1.8 km || 
|-id=233 bgcolor=#E9E9E9
| 436233 ||  || — || January 8, 2010 || Kitt Peak || Spacewatch || DOR || align=right | 2.5 km || 
|-id=234 bgcolor=#E9E9E9
| 436234 ||  || — || November 20, 2009 || Kitt Peak || Spacewatch || — || align=right | 2.9 km || 
|-id=235 bgcolor=#E9E9E9
| 436235 ||  || — || January 11, 2010 || Kitt Peak || Spacewatch || — || align=right | 2.9 km || 
|-id=236 bgcolor=#E9E9E9
| 436236 ||  || — || January 6, 2010 || Catalina || CSS || — || align=right | 1.5 km || 
|-id=237 bgcolor=#E9E9E9
| 436237 ||  || — || January 23, 2006 || Kitt Peak || Spacewatch || (5) || align=right data-sort-value="0.94" | 940 m || 
|-id=238 bgcolor=#E9E9E9
| 436238 ||  || — || October 27, 2005 || Mount Lemmon || Mount Lemmon Survey || RAF || align=right | 1.1 km || 
|-id=239 bgcolor=#E9E9E9
| 436239 ||  || — || January 11, 2010 || Kitt Peak || Spacewatch || — || align=right | 1.3 km || 
|-id=240 bgcolor=#E9E9E9
| 436240 ||  || — || October 18, 2009 || Mount Lemmon || Mount Lemmon Survey || — || align=right data-sort-value="0.97" | 970 m || 
|-id=241 bgcolor=#C2FFFF
| 436241 ||  || — || January 8, 2010 || WISE || WISE || L4 || align=right | 12 km || 
|-id=242 bgcolor=#d6d6d6
| 436242 ||  || — || January 8, 2010 || WISE || WISE || — || align=right | 3.3 km || 
|-id=243 bgcolor=#E9E9E9
| 436243 ||  || — || October 27, 2008 || Mount Lemmon || Mount Lemmon Survey || DOR || align=right | 2.7 km || 
|-id=244 bgcolor=#E9E9E9
| 436244 ||  || — || January 23, 2010 || Bisei SG Center || BATTeRS || — || align=right | 2.0 km || 
|-id=245 bgcolor=#E9E9E9
| 436245 ||  || — || January 24, 2010 || Siding Spring || SSS || — || align=right | 3.2 km || 
|-id=246 bgcolor=#d6d6d6
| 436246 ||  || — || October 12, 2007 || Catalina || CSS || Tj (2.99) || align=right | 4.2 km || 
|-id=247 bgcolor=#C2FFFF
| 436247 ||  || — || November 17, 2009 || Mount Lemmon || Mount Lemmon Survey || L4 || align=right | 11 km || 
|-id=248 bgcolor=#d6d6d6
| 436248 ||  || — || January 21, 2010 || WISE || WISE || — || align=right | 4.4 km || 
|-id=249 bgcolor=#d6d6d6
| 436249 ||  || — || September 13, 2007 || Mount Lemmon || Mount Lemmon Survey || — || align=right | 3.4 km || 
|-id=250 bgcolor=#E9E9E9
| 436250 ||  || — || January 24, 2010 || WISE || WISE || — || align=right | 2.4 km || 
|-id=251 bgcolor=#d6d6d6
| 436251 ||  || — || January 17, 2009 || Mount Lemmon || Mount Lemmon Survey || — || align=right | 2.9 km || 
|-id=252 bgcolor=#d6d6d6
| 436252 ||  || — || December 1, 2008 || Mount Lemmon || Mount Lemmon Survey || — || align=right | 4.0 km || 
|-id=253 bgcolor=#d6d6d6
| 436253 ||  || — || January 26, 2010 || WISE || WISE || — || align=right | 3.7 km || 
|-id=254 bgcolor=#d6d6d6
| 436254 ||  || — || July 30, 2006 || Siding Spring || SSS || — || align=right | 4.8 km || 
|-id=255 bgcolor=#C2FFFF
| 436255 ||  || — || November 10, 2009 || Mount Lemmon || Mount Lemmon Survey || L4 || align=right | 10 km || 
|-id=256 bgcolor=#E9E9E9
| 436256 ||  || — || January 11, 2010 || Kitt Peak || Spacewatch || — || align=right | 1.8 km || 
|-id=257 bgcolor=#E9E9E9
| 436257 ||  || — || February 5, 2010 || Kitt Peak || Spacewatch || — || align=right | 1.2 km || 
|-id=258 bgcolor=#E9E9E9
| 436258 ||  || — || February 5, 2010 || Kitt Peak || Spacewatch || — || align=right | 2.2 km || 
|-id=259 bgcolor=#E9E9E9
| 436259 ||  || — || February 6, 2010 || Mount Lemmon || Mount Lemmon Survey || — || align=right | 1.8 km || 
|-id=260 bgcolor=#d6d6d6
| 436260 ||  || — || February 6, 2010 || WISE || WISE || — || align=right | 4.2 km || 
|-id=261 bgcolor=#d6d6d6
| 436261 ||  || — || February 7, 2010 || WISE || WISE || — || align=right | 4.0 km || 
|-id=262 bgcolor=#E9E9E9
| 436262 ||  || — || February 9, 2010 || WISE || WISE || DOR || align=right | 2.7 km || 
|-id=263 bgcolor=#E9E9E9
| 436263 ||  || — || February 9, 2010 || Kitt Peak || Spacewatch || AGN || align=right | 2.5 km || 
|-id=264 bgcolor=#E9E9E9
| 436264 ||  || — || February 9, 2010 || Mount Lemmon || Mount Lemmon Survey || — || align=right | 2.1 km || 
|-id=265 bgcolor=#E9E9E9
| 436265 ||  || — || September 11, 2007 || Mount Lemmon || Mount Lemmon Survey || — || align=right | 1.4 km || 
|-id=266 bgcolor=#E9E9E9
| 436266 ||  || — || February 9, 2010 || Kitt Peak || Spacewatch || — || align=right | 1.7 km || 
|-id=267 bgcolor=#E9E9E9
| 436267 ||  || — || February 13, 2010 || Mount Lemmon || Mount Lemmon Survey || — || align=right | 1.8 km || 
|-id=268 bgcolor=#E9E9E9
| 436268 ||  || — || February 13, 2010 || Mount Lemmon || Mount Lemmon Survey || — || align=right | 2.6 km || 
|-id=269 bgcolor=#E9E9E9
| 436269 ||  || — || January 7, 2010 || Kitt Peak || Spacewatch || EUN || align=right | 1.3 km || 
|-id=270 bgcolor=#E9E9E9
| 436270 ||  || — || September 16, 2003 || Kitt Peak || Spacewatch || — || align=right | 1.7 km || 
|-id=271 bgcolor=#E9E9E9
| 436271 ||  || — || February 14, 2010 || Kitt Peak || Spacewatch || AEO || align=right | 1.0 km || 
|-id=272 bgcolor=#E9E9E9
| 436272 ||  || — || February 14, 2010 || Mount Lemmon || Mount Lemmon Survey || ADE || align=right | 2.0 km || 
|-id=273 bgcolor=#E9E9E9
| 436273 ||  || — || February 15, 2010 || Socorro || LINEAR || — || align=right | 2.0 km || 
|-id=274 bgcolor=#E9E9E9
| 436274 ||  || — || February 27, 2006 || Kitt Peak || Spacewatch || — || align=right | 1.1 km || 
|-id=275 bgcolor=#E9E9E9
| 436275 ||  || — || September 27, 2003 || Kitt Peak || Spacewatch || — || align=right | 2.6 km || 
|-id=276 bgcolor=#E9E9E9
| 436276 ||  || — || January 15, 2010 || Catalina || CSS || — || align=right | 2.6 km || 
|-id=277 bgcolor=#E9E9E9
| 436277 ||  || — || February 13, 2010 || Catalina || CSS || — || align=right | 3.1 km || 
|-id=278 bgcolor=#E9E9E9
| 436278 ||  || — || October 22, 2008 || Mount Lemmon || Mount Lemmon Survey || — || align=right | 2.3 km || 
|-id=279 bgcolor=#E9E9E9
| 436279 ||  || — || February 10, 2010 || Kitt Peak || Spacewatch || — || align=right | 2.0 km || 
|-id=280 bgcolor=#E9E9E9
| 436280 ||  || — || December 8, 2008 || Mount Lemmon || Mount Lemmon Survey || — || align=right | 2.0 km || 
|-id=281 bgcolor=#E9E9E9
| 436281 ||  || — || February 14, 2010 || Haleakala || Pan-STARRS || — || align=right | 2.0 km || 
|-id=282 bgcolor=#E9E9E9
| 436282 ||  || — || September 17, 2004 || Kitt Peak || Spacewatch || — || align=right | 1.4 km || 
|-id=283 bgcolor=#E9E9E9
| 436283 ||  || — || February 13, 2010 || Socorro || LINEAR || GEF || align=right | 3.7 km || 
|-id=284 bgcolor=#d6d6d6
| 436284 ||  || — || November 13, 2007 || Kitt Peak || Spacewatch || — || align=right | 4.1 km || 
|-id=285 bgcolor=#d6d6d6
| 436285 ||  || — || February 6, 2010 || WISE || WISE || — || align=right | 4.8 km || 
|-id=286 bgcolor=#d6d6d6
| 436286 ||  || — || August 21, 2006 || Kitt Peak || Spacewatch || EOS || align=right | 4.3 km || 
|-id=287 bgcolor=#d6d6d6
| 436287 ||  || — || February 9, 2010 || WISE || WISE || — || align=right | 3.5 km || 
|-id=288 bgcolor=#d6d6d6
| 436288 ||  || — || February 10, 2010 || WISE || WISE || — || align=right | 3.3 km || 
|-id=289 bgcolor=#d6d6d6
| 436289 ||  || — || February 15, 2010 || WISE || WISE || — || align=right | 3.7 km || 
|-id=290 bgcolor=#d6d6d6
| 436290 ||  || — || February 20, 2010 || WISE || WISE || — || align=right | 3.3 km || 
|-id=291 bgcolor=#d6d6d6
| 436291 ||  || — || February 20, 2010 || WISE || WISE || — || align=right | 4.0 km || 
|-id=292 bgcolor=#E9E9E9
| 436292 ||  || — || February 16, 2010 || Mount Lemmon || Mount Lemmon Survey || KON || align=right | 3.0 km || 
|-id=293 bgcolor=#E9E9E9
| 436293 ||  || — || February 17, 2010 || Kitt Peak || Spacewatch || — || align=right | 2.2 km || 
|-id=294 bgcolor=#E9E9E9
| 436294 ||  || — || February 17, 2010 || Kitt Peak || Spacewatch || — || align=right | 1.5 km || 
|-id=295 bgcolor=#E9E9E9
| 436295 ||  || — || February 17, 2010 || Kitt Peak || Spacewatch || — || align=right | 1.8 km || 
|-id=296 bgcolor=#E9E9E9
| 436296 ||  || — || February 17, 2010 || Mount Lemmon || Mount Lemmon Survey || — || align=right | 1.8 km || 
|-id=297 bgcolor=#d6d6d6
| 436297 ||  || — || February 22, 2010 || WISE || WISE || — || align=right | 4.2 km || 
|-id=298 bgcolor=#d6d6d6
| 436298 ||  || — || February 25, 2010 || WISE || WISE || — || align=right | 2.7 km || 
|-id=299 bgcolor=#d6d6d6
| 436299 ||  || — || March 2, 2010 || WISE || WISE || — || align=right | 4.3 km || 
|-id=300 bgcolor=#d6d6d6
| 436300 ||  || — || March 2, 2010 || WISE || WISE || — || align=right | 4.0 km || 
|}

436301–436400 

|-bgcolor=#d6d6d6
| 436301 ||  || — || March 3, 2010 || WISE || WISE || — || align=right | 5.0 km || 
|-id=302 bgcolor=#d6d6d6
| 436302 ||  || — || September 12, 2007 || Mount Lemmon || Mount Lemmon Survey || — || align=right | 2.5 km || 
|-id=303 bgcolor=#d6d6d6
| 436303 ||  || — || February 16, 2010 || Mount Lemmon || Mount Lemmon Survey || EOS || align=right | 2.1 km || 
|-id=304 bgcolor=#E9E9E9
| 436304 ||  || — || March 12, 2010 || Kitt Peak || Spacewatch || — || align=right | 2.5 km || 
|-id=305 bgcolor=#E9E9E9
| 436305 ||  || — || March 12, 2010 || Mount Lemmon || Mount Lemmon Survey || — || align=right | 2.0 km || 
|-id=306 bgcolor=#E9E9E9
| 436306 ||  || — || March 12, 2010 || Mount Lemmon || Mount Lemmon Survey || — || align=right | 2.9 km || 
|-id=307 bgcolor=#E9E9E9
| 436307 ||  || — || March 13, 2010 || Catalina || CSS || — || align=right | 2.8 km || 
|-id=308 bgcolor=#E9E9E9
| 436308 ||  || — || March 14, 2010 || Mount Lemmon || Mount Lemmon Survey || — || align=right | 1.6 km || 
|-id=309 bgcolor=#E9E9E9
| 436309 ||  || — || February 18, 2010 || Mount Lemmon || Mount Lemmon Survey || — || align=right | 2.0 km || 
|-id=310 bgcolor=#E9E9E9
| 436310 ||  || — || March 14, 2010 || Kitt Peak || Spacewatch || — || align=right | 3.2 km || 
|-id=311 bgcolor=#E9E9E9
| 436311 ||  || — || March 12, 2010 || Catalina || CSS || DOR || align=right | 3.1 km || 
|-id=312 bgcolor=#E9E9E9
| 436312 ||  || — || March 14, 2010 || Kitt Peak || Spacewatch || — || align=right | 2.6 km || 
|-id=313 bgcolor=#E9E9E9
| 436313 ||  || — || November 23, 2003 || Kitt Peak || Spacewatch || — || align=right | 2.1 km || 
|-id=314 bgcolor=#d6d6d6
| 436314 ||  || — || March 12, 2010 || Kitt Peak || Spacewatch || — || align=right | 2.4 km || 
|-id=315 bgcolor=#E9E9E9
| 436315 ||  || — || March 18, 2010 || Mount Lemmon || Mount Lemmon Survey || — || align=right | 2.7 km || 
|-id=316 bgcolor=#d6d6d6
| 436316 ||  || — || March 20, 2010 || Mount Lemmon || Mount Lemmon Survey || — || align=right | 4.0 km || 
|-id=317 bgcolor=#E9E9E9
| 436317 ||  || — || March 22, 2010 || ESA OGS || ESA OGS || — || align=right | 1.8 km || 
|-id=318 bgcolor=#E9E9E9
| 436318 ||  || — || March 20, 2010 || Catalina || CSS || — || align=right | 2.0 km || 
|-id=319 bgcolor=#E9E9E9
| 436319 ||  || — || December 20, 2009 || Catalina || CSS || — || align=right | 1.2 km || 
|-id=320 bgcolor=#E9E9E9
| 436320 ||  || — || March 25, 2010 || Kitt Peak || Spacewatch || — || align=right | 2.9 km || 
|-id=321 bgcolor=#E9E9E9
| 436321 ||  || — || March 20, 2010 || Catalina || CSS || — || align=right | 2.8 km || 
|-id=322 bgcolor=#d6d6d6
| 436322 ||  || — || September 12, 2007 || Mount Lemmon || Mount Lemmon Survey || — || align=right | 2.3 km || 
|-id=323 bgcolor=#E9E9E9
| 436323 ||  || — || September 13, 2007 || Mount Lemmon || Mount Lemmon Survey || AST || align=right | 1.5 km || 
|-id=324 bgcolor=#FFC2E0
| 436324 ||  || — || April 6, 2010 || Catalina || CSS || AMO || align=right data-sort-value="0.37" | 370 m || 
|-id=325 bgcolor=#FFC2E0
| 436325 ||  || — || April 6, 2010 || Socorro || LINEAR || APO || align=right data-sort-value="0.45" | 450 m || 
|-id=326 bgcolor=#E9E9E9
| 436326 ||  || — || April 8, 2010 || Sandlot || G. Hug || — || align=right | 1.9 km || 
|-id=327 bgcolor=#E9E9E9
| 436327 ||  || — || April 5, 2010 || Mount Lemmon || Mount Lemmon Survey || — || align=right | 2.5 km || 
|-id=328 bgcolor=#E9E9E9
| 436328 ||  || — || April 10, 2010 || WISE || WISE || — || align=right | 2.8 km || 
|-id=329 bgcolor=#FFC2E0
| 436329 ||  || — || January 16, 2010 || WISE || WISE || APOPHAcritical || align=right data-sort-value="0.62" | 620 m || 
|-id=330 bgcolor=#E9E9E9
| 436330 ||  || — || March 13, 2010 || Kitt Peak || Spacewatch || GEF || align=right | 1.0 km || 
|-id=331 bgcolor=#E9E9E9
| 436331 ||  || — || March 16, 2010 || Kitt Peak || Spacewatch || — || align=right | 2.5 km || 
|-id=332 bgcolor=#d6d6d6
| 436332 ||  || — || May 8, 1994 || Kitt Peak || Spacewatch || — || align=right | 3.0 km || 
|-id=333 bgcolor=#d6d6d6
| 436333 ||  || — || April 12, 2010 || WISE || WISE || — || align=right | 3.1 km || 
|-id=334 bgcolor=#d6d6d6
| 436334 ||  || — || April 7, 2010 || Catalina || CSS || — || align=right | 3.1 km || 
|-id=335 bgcolor=#E9E9E9
| 436335 ||  || — || January 1, 2009 || Mount Lemmon || Mount Lemmon Survey || — || align=right | 2.2 km || 
|-id=336 bgcolor=#d6d6d6
| 436336 ||  || — || April 18, 2010 || WISE || WISE || — || align=right | 3.7 km || 
|-id=337 bgcolor=#d6d6d6
| 436337 ||  || — || April 25, 2010 || Mount Lemmon || Mount Lemmon Survey || — || align=right | 3.5 km || 
|-id=338 bgcolor=#d6d6d6
| 436338 ||  || — || April 22, 2010 || WISE || WISE || — || align=right | 4.7 km || 
|-id=339 bgcolor=#d6d6d6
| 436339 ||  || — || April 22, 2010 || WISE || WISE || — || align=right | 1.8 km || 
|-id=340 bgcolor=#d6d6d6
| 436340 ||  || — || January 30, 2009 || Kitt Peak || Spacewatch || — || align=right | 2.4 km || 
|-id=341 bgcolor=#fefefe
| 436341 ||  || — || April 25, 2010 || Mount Lemmon || Mount Lemmon Survey || H || align=right data-sort-value="0.77" | 770 m || 
|-id=342 bgcolor=#d6d6d6
| 436342 ||  || — || April 25, 2010 || Kitt Peak || Spacewatch || — || align=right | 2.5 km || 
|-id=343 bgcolor=#d6d6d6
| 436343 ||  || — || May 5, 2010 || Nogales || Tenagra II Obs. || — || align=right | 4.5 km || 
|-id=344 bgcolor=#E9E9E9
| 436344 ||  || — || October 9, 2008 || Catalina || CSS || — || align=right | 4.1 km || 
|-id=345 bgcolor=#d6d6d6
| 436345 ||  || — || May 3, 2010 || WISE || WISE || — || align=right | 4.1 km || 
|-id=346 bgcolor=#d6d6d6
| 436346 ||  || — || May 6, 2010 || Mount Lemmon || Mount Lemmon Survey || — || align=right | 3.9 km || 
|-id=347 bgcolor=#fefefe
| 436347 ||  || — || April 20, 2010 || Mount Lemmon || Mount Lemmon Survey || H || align=right data-sort-value="0.67" | 670 m || 
|-id=348 bgcolor=#d6d6d6
| 436348 ||  || — || August 28, 2006 || Kitt Peak || Spacewatch || — || align=right | 3.0 km || 
|-id=349 bgcolor=#d6d6d6
| 436349 ||  || — || January 21, 2010 || WISE || WISE || — || align=right | 3.2 km || 
|-id=350 bgcolor=#d6d6d6
| 436350 ||  || — || May 7, 2010 || Kitt Peak || Spacewatch || — || align=right | 3.4 km || 
|-id=351 bgcolor=#d6d6d6
| 436351 ||  || — || April 9, 2010 || Mount Lemmon || Mount Lemmon Survey || — || align=right | 3.2 km || 
|-id=352 bgcolor=#d6d6d6
| 436352 ||  || — || May 3, 2010 || Nogales || Tenagra II Obs. || — || align=right | 3.2 km || 
|-id=353 bgcolor=#d6d6d6
| 436353 ||  || — || February 10, 2010 || WISE || WISE || — || align=right | 2.3 km || 
|-id=354 bgcolor=#d6d6d6
| 436354 ||  || — || May 11, 2010 || Mount Lemmon || Mount Lemmon Survey || — || align=right | 3.2 km || 
|-id=355 bgcolor=#d6d6d6
| 436355 ||  || — || May 7, 2010 || Kitt Peak || Spacewatch || HYG || align=right | 3.3 km || 
|-id=356 bgcolor=#d6d6d6
| 436356 ||  || — || May 14, 2010 || WISE || WISE || — || align=right | 3.8 km || 
|-id=357 bgcolor=#d6d6d6
| 436357 ||  || — || May 3, 2010 || Kitt Peak || Spacewatch || TIR || align=right | 2.9 km || 
|-id=358 bgcolor=#d6d6d6
| 436358 ||  || — || May 13, 2010 || Kitt Peak || Spacewatch || — || align=right | 3.5 km || 
|-id=359 bgcolor=#d6d6d6
| 436359 ||  || — || May 16, 2010 || WISE || WISE || — || align=right | 4.1 km || 
|-id=360 bgcolor=#d6d6d6
| 436360 ||  || — || May 17, 2010 || WISE || WISE || — || align=right | 3.5 km || 
|-id=361 bgcolor=#d6d6d6
| 436361 ||  || — || May 19, 2010 || WISE || WISE || THB || align=right | 3.5 km || 
|-id=362 bgcolor=#d6d6d6
| 436362 ||  || — || February 2, 2008 || Kitt Peak || Spacewatch || — || align=right | 5.0 km || 
|-id=363 bgcolor=#d6d6d6
| 436363 ||  || — || November 18, 2007 || Kitt Peak || Spacewatch || — || align=right | 2.2 km || 
|-id=364 bgcolor=#d6d6d6
| 436364 ||  || — || November 9, 2007 || Kitt Peak || Spacewatch || — || align=right | 2.5 km || 
|-id=365 bgcolor=#d6d6d6
| 436365 ||  || — || May 31, 2010 || WISE || WISE || THB || align=right | 3.7 km || 
|-id=366 bgcolor=#d6d6d6
| 436366 ||  || — || June 7, 2010 || Kitt Peak || Spacewatch || EOS || align=right | 2.3 km || 
|-id=367 bgcolor=#d6d6d6
| 436367 ||  || — || June 7, 2010 || Kitt Peak || Spacewatch || — || align=right | 2.5 km || 
|-id=368 bgcolor=#d6d6d6
| 436368 ||  || — || June 9, 2010 || WISE || WISE || — || align=right | 2.9 km || 
|-id=369 bgcolor=#d6d6d6
| 436369 ||  || — || June 10, 2010 || WISE || WISE || Tj (2.98) || align=right | 4.7 km || 
|-id=370 bgcolor=#d6d6d6
| 436370 ||  || — || June 30, 2010 || WISE || WISE || SHU3:2 || align=right | 7.1 km || 
|-id=371 bgcolor=#d6d6d6
| 436371 ||  || — || July 15, 2010 || Andrushivka || Andrushivka Obs. || — || align=right | 4.1 km || 
|-id=372 bgcolor=#d6d6d6
| 436372 ||  || — || December 4, 2005 || Catalina || CSS || — || align=right | 6.2 km || 
|-id=373 bgcolor=#d6d6d6
| 436373 ||  || — || January 30, 2010 || WISE || WISE || — || align=right | 4.6 km || 
|-id=374 bgcolor=#d6d6d6
| 436374 ||  || — || July 23, 2010 || WISE || WISE || — || align=right | 4.5 km || 
|-id=375 bgcolor=#d6d6d6
| 436375 ||  || — || July 25, 2010 || WISE || WISE || — || align=right | 4.0 km || 
|-id=376 bgcolor=#d6d6d6
| 436376 ||  || — || July 17, 2010 || La Sagra || OAM Obs. || — || align=right | 3.4 km || 
|-id=377 bgcolor=#d6d6d6
| 436377 ||  || — || February 3, 2010 || WISE || WISE || — || align=right | 2.9 km || 
|-id=378 bgcolor=#d6d6d6
| 436378 ||  || — || January 29, 2009 || Mount Lemmon || Mount Lemmon Survey || — || align=right | 4.4 km || 
|-id=379 bgcolor=#d6d6d6
| 436379 ||  || — || July 30, 2010 || WISE || WISE || — || align=right | 3.9 km || 
|-id=380 bgcolor=#d6d6d6
| 436380 ||  || — || August 9, 2010 || WISE || WISE || 3:2 || align=right | 4.7 km || 
|-id=381 bgcolor=#C2FFFF
| 436381 ||  || — || September 11, 2010 || Mount Lemmon || Mount Lemmon Survey || L4 || align=right | 7.8 km || 
|-id=382 bgcolor=#C2FFFF
| 436382 ||  || — || September 11, 2010 || Mount Lemmon || Mount Lemmon Survey || L4 || align=right | 9.3 km || 
|-id=383 bgcolor=#fefefe
| 436383 ||  || — || September 10, 2010 || Kitt Peak || Spacewatch || — || align=right data-sort-value="0.68" | 680 m || 
|-id=384 bgcolor=#FA8072
| 436384 ||  || — || October 6, 2010 || Siding Spring || SSS || — || align=right data-sort-value="0.96" | 960 m || 
|-id=385 bgcolor=#fefefe
| 436385 ||  || — || October 1, 2010 || Mount Lemmon || Mount Lemmon Survey || — || align=right data-sort-value="0.52" | 520 m || 
|-id=386 bgcolor=#fefefe
| 436386 ||  || — || November 2, 2007 || Kitt Peak || Spacewatch || — || align=right data-sort-value="0.46" | 460 m || 
|-id=387 bgcolor=#fefefe
| 436387 ||  || — || November 2, 2010 || Mount Lemmon || Mount Lemmon Survey || — || align=right data-sort-value="0.80" | 800 m || 
|-id=388 bgcolor=#C2FFFF
| 436388 ||  || — || January 16, 2010 || WISE || WISE || L4 || align=right | 10 km || 
|-id=389 bgcolor=#fefefe
| 436389 ||  || — || November 2, 2010 || Mount Lemmon || Mount Lemmon Survey || — || align=right data-sort-value="0.59" | 590 m || 
|-id=390 bgcolor=#d6d6d6
| 436390 ||  || — || October 4, 2002 || Campo Imperatore || CINEOS || (6124)3:2 || align=right | 5.5 km || 
|-id=391 bgcolor=#C2FFFF
| 436391 ||  || — || October 17, 2010 || Mount Lemmon || Mount Lemmon Survey || L4 || align=right | 7.3 km || 
|-id=392 bgcolor=#fefefe
| 436392 ||  || — || October 13, 2010 || Mount Lemmon || Mount Lemmon Survey || — || align=right data-sort-value="0.64" | 640 m || 
|-id=393 bgcolor=#C2FFFF
| 436393 ||  || — || November 6, 2010 || Mount Lemmon || Mount Lemmon Survey || L4 || align=right | 8.9 km || 
|-id=394 bgcolor=#C2FFFF
| 436394 ||  || — || September 27, 2009 || Kitt Peak || Spacewatch || L4 || align=right | 7.7 km || 
|-id=395 bgcolor=#fefefe
| 436395 ||  || — || October 13, 2010 || Mount Lemmon || Mount Lemmon Survey || — || align=right data-sort-value="0.80" | 800 m || 
|-id=396 bgcolor=#C2FFFF
| 436396 ||  || — || November 11, 2010 || Mount Lemmon || Mount Lemmon Survey || L4 || align=right | 9.4 km || 
|-id=397 bgcolor=#C2FFFF
| 436397 ||  || — || September 28, 2009 || Mount Lemmon || Mount Lemmon Survey || L4 || align=right | 8.0 km || 
|-id=398 bgcolor=#C2FFFF
| 436398 ||  || — || October 14, 2010 || Mount Lemmon || Mount Lemmon Survey || L4 || align=right | 7.9 km || 
|-id=399 bgcolor=#d6d6d6
| 436399 ||  || — || September 30, 2010 || Mount Lemmon || Mount Lemmon Survey || 3:2 || align=right | 4.4 km || 
|-id=400 bgcolor=#d6d6d6
| 436400 ||  || — || September 11, 2004 || Socorro || LINEAR || — || align=right | 3.9 km || 
|}

436401–436500 

|-bgcolor=#C2FFFF
| 436401 ||  || — || October 22, 2009 || Mount Lemmon || Mount Lemmon Survey || L4 || align=right | 8.0 km || 
|-id=402 bgcolor=#fefefe
| 436402 ||  || — || January 1, 2008 || Mount Lemmon || Mount Lemmon Survey || — || align=right data-sort-value="0.58" | 580 m || 
|-id=403 bgcolor=#C2FFFF
| 436403 ||  || — || October 29, 2010 || Kitt Peak || Spacewatch || L4 || align=right | 8.1 km || 
|-id=404 bgcolor=#fefefe
| 436404 ||  || — || November 7, 2010 || Mount Lemmon || Mount Lemmon Survey || — || align=right data-sort-value="0.91" | 910 m || 
|-id=405 bgcolor=#C2FFFF
| 436405 ||  || — || September 21, 2009 || Kitt Peak || Spacewatch || L4 || align=right | 6.9 km || 
|-id=406 bgcolor=#fefefe
| 436406 ||  || — || November 5, 2010 || Mount Lemmon || Mount Lemmon Survey || — || align=right data-sort-value="0.75" | 750 m || 
|-id=407 bgcolor=#fefefe
| 436407 ||  || — || February 3, 2008 || Mount Lemmon || Mount Lemmon Survey || — || align=right data-sort-value="0.72" | 720 m || 
|-id=408 bgcolor=#fefefe
| 436408 ||  || — || June 13, 2005 || Mount Lemmon || Mount Lemmon Survey || — || align=right data-sort-value="0.94" | 940 m || 
|-id=409 bgcolor=#C2FFFF
| 436409 ||  || — || November 10, 2010 || Mount Lemmon || Mount Lemmon Survey || L4 || align=right | 8.0 km || 
|-id=410 bgcolor=#fefefe
| 436410 ||  || — || December 14, 2010 || Mount Lemmon || Mount Lemmon Survey || — || align=right data-sort-value="0.73" | 730 m || 
|-id=411 bgcolor=#fefefe
| 436411 ||  || — || November 3, 2010 || Mount Lemmon || Mount Lemmon Survey || — || align=right data-sort-value="0.86" | 860 m || 
|-id=412 bgcolor=#fefefe
| 436412 ||  || — || April 4, 2008 || Kitt Peak || Spacewatch || — || align=right data-sort-value="0.81" | 810 m || 
|-id=413 bgcolor=#fefefe
| 436413 ||  || — || February 10, 2008 || Mount Lemmon || Mount Lemmon Survey || — || align=right data-sort-value="0.66" | 660 m || 
|-id=414 bgcolor=#fefefe
| 436414 ||  || — || May 14, 2008 || Mount Lemmon || Mount Lemmon Survey || MAS || align=right data-sort-value="0.62" | 620 m || 
|-id=415 bgcolor=#fefefe
| 436415 ||  || — || January 10, 2011 || Kitt Peak || Spacewatch || — || align=right data-sort-value="0.63" | 630 m || 
|-id=416 bgcolor=#fefefe
| 436416 ||  || — || January 12, 2011 || Mount Lemmon || Mount Lemmon Survey || — || align=right data-sort-value="0.65" | 650 m || 
|-id=417 bgcolor=#fefefe
| 436417 ||  || — || September 28, 2006 || Kitt Peak || Spacewatch || — || align=right data-sort-value="0.75" | 750 m || 
|-id=418 bgcolor=#fefefe
| 436418 ||  || — || January 12, 2011 || Mount Lemmon || Mount Lemmon Survey || — || align=right data-sort-value="0.62" | 620 m || 
|-id=419 bgcolor=#fefefe
| 436419 ||  || — || January 13, 2011 || Mount Lemmon || Mount Lemmon Survey || — || align=right data-sort-value="0.65" | 650 m || 
|-id=420 bgcolor=#fefefe
| 436420 ||  || — || February 1, 1995 || Kitt Peak || Spacewatch || — || align=right data-sort-value="0.78" | 780 m || 
|-id=421 bgcolor=#fefefe
| 436421 ||  || — || September 17, 2006 || Kitt Peak || Spacewatch || — || align=right data-sort-value="0.77" | 770 m || 
|-id=422 bgcolor=#fefefe
| 436422 ||  || — || May 27, 2008 || Kitt Peak || Spacewatch || NYS || align=right data-sort-value="0.55" | 550 m || 
|-id=423 bgcolor=#fefefe
| 436423 ||  || — || March 1, 2008 || Kitt Peak || Spacewatch || — || align=right data-sort-value="0.67" | 670 m || 
|-id=424 bgcolor=#fefefe
| 436424 ||  || — || March 29, 2008 || Kitt Peak || Spacewatch || — || align=right data-sort-value="0.73" | 730 m || 
|-id=425 bgcolor=#fefefe
| 436425 ||  || — || November 15, 2010 || Mount Lemmon || Mount Lemmon Survey || — || align=right | 1.1 km || 
|-id=426 bgcolor=#fefefe
| 436426 ||  || — || November 5, 2010 || Mount Lemmon || Mount Lemmon Survey || — || align=right data-sort-value="0.87" | 870 m || 
|-id=427 bgcolor=#fefefe
| 436427 ||  || — || March 17, 2004 || Kitt Peak || Spacewatch || NYS || align=right data-sort-value="0.50" | 500 m || 
|-id=428 bgcolor=#fefefe
| 436428 ||  || — || September 14, 2006 || Catalina || CSS || — || align=right data-sort-value="0.76" | 760 m || 
|-id=429 bgcolor=#fefefe
| 436429 ||  || — || March 18, 2004 || Socorro || LINEAR || (2076) || align=right data-sort-value="0.84" | 840 m || 
|-id=430 bgcolor=#fefefe
| 436430 ||  || — || January 2, 2011 || Mount Lemmon || Mount Lemmon Survey || — || align=right data-sort-value="0.96" | 960 m || 
|-id=431 bgcolor=#fefefe
| 436431 ||  || — || September 18, 2009 || Kitt Peak || Spacewatch || — || align=right data-sort-value="0.87" | 870 m || 
|-id=432 bgcolor=#fefefe
| 436432 ||  || — || March 15, 2004 || Catalina || CSS || — || align=right data-sort-value="0.94" | 940 m || 
|-id=433 bgcolor=#fefefe
| 436433 ||  || — || April 8, 1997 || Kitt Peak || Spacewatch || — || align=right data-sort-value="0.78" | 780 m || 
|-id=434 bgcolor=#E9E9E9
| 436434 ||  || — || January 30, 2011 || Mount Lemmon || Mount Lemmon Survey || — || align=right data-sort-value="0.71" | 710 m || 
|-id=435 bgcolor=#fefefe
| 436435 ||  || — || April 15, 2004 || Catalina || CSS || — || align=right data-sort-value="0.78" | 780 m || 
|-id=436 bgcolor=#fefefe
| 436436 ||  || — || June 14, 2005 || Kitt Peak || Spacewatch || — || align=right data-sort-value="0.89" | 890 m || 
|-id=437 bgcolor=#fefefe
| 436437 ||  || — || April 30, 2004 || Kitt Peak || Spacewatch || — || align=right data-sort-value="0.82" | 820 m || 
|-id=438 bgcolor=#fefefe
| 436438 ||  || — || February 11, 2004 || Kitt Peak || Spacewatch || — || align=right data-sort-value="0.65" | 650 m || 
|-id=439 bgcolor=#fefefe
| 436439 ||  || — || February 12, 2004 || Kitt Peak || Spacewatch || — || align=right data-sort-value="0.68" | 680 m || 
|-id=440 bgcolor=#fefefe
| 436440 ||  || — || November 21, 2006 || Mount Lemmon || Mount Lemmon Survey || — || align=right data-sort-value="0.76" | 760 m || 
|-id=441 bgcolor=#fefefe
| 436441 ||  || — || November 16, 2006 || Kitt Peak || Spacewatch || — || align=right data-sort-value="0.61" | 610 m || 
|-id=442 bgcolor=#fefefe
| 436442 ||  || — || January 24, 2011 || Mount Lemmon || Mount Lemmon Survey || — || align=right | 1.1 km || 
|-id=443 bgcolor=#fefefe
| 436443 ||  || — || January 13, 2011 || Kitt Peak || Spacewatch || MAS || align=right data-sort-value="0.66" | 660 m || 
|-id=444 bgcolor=#fefefe
| 436444 ||  || — || April 26, 2008 || Kitt Peak || Spacewatch || V || align=right data-sort-value="0.47" | 470 m || 
|-id=445 bgcolor=#fefefe
| 436445 ||  || — || February 22, 2004 || Kitt Peak || Spacewatch || — || align=right data-sort-value="0.68" | 680 m || 
|-id=446 bgcolor=#fefefe
| 436446 ||  || — || January 13, 2011 || Kitt Peak || Spacewatch || — || align=right data-sort-value="0.73" | 730 m || 
|-id=447 bgcolor=#fefefe
| 436447 ||  || — || March 17, 2004 || Kitt Peak || Spacewatch || MAS || align=right data-sort-value="0.59" | 590 m || 
|-id=448 bgcolor=#fefefe
| 436448 ||  || — || February 16, 2004 || Kitt Peak || Spacewatch || — || align=right data-sort-value="0.86" | 860 m || 
|-id=449 bgcolor=#fefefe
| 436449 ||  || — || October 3, 2002 || Socorro || LINEAR || — || align=right data-sort-value="0.91" | 910 m || 
|-id=450 bgcolor=#fefefe
| 436450 ||  || — || March 29, 2008 || Kitt Peak || Spacewatch || — || align=right data-sort-value="0.79" | 790 m || 
|-id=451 bgcolor=#E9E9E9
| 436451 ||  || — || March 16, 2007 || Kitt Peak || Spacewatch || — || align=right | 1.2 km || 
|-id=452 bgcolor=#E9E9E9
| 436452 ||  || — || December 11, 2010 || Mount Lemmon || Mount Lemmon Survey || — || align=right | 1.6 km || 
|-id=453 bgcolor=#fefefe
| 436453 ||  || — || January 7, 2000 || Kitt Peak || Spacewatch || — || align=right data-sort-value="0.86" | 860 m || 
|-id=454 bgcolor=#fefefe
| 436454 ||  || — || December 13, 2006 || Kitt Peak || Spacewatch || — || align=right data-sort-value="0.87" | 870 m || 
|-id=455 bgcolor=#fefefe
| 436455 ||  || — || January 24, 2011 || Mount Lemmon || Mount Lemmon Survey || — || align=right data-sort-value="0.71" | 710 m || 
|-id=456 bgcolor=#fefefe
| 436456 ||  || — || October 19, 2006 || Catalina || CSS || — || align=right data-sort-value="0.85" | 850 m || 
|-id=457 bgcolor=#fefefe
| 436457 ||  || — || December 14, 2006 || Kitt Peak || Spacewatch || — || align=right data-sort-value="0.67" | 670 m || 
|-id=458 bgcolor=#fefefe
| 436458 ||  || — || January 26, 2000 || Kitt Peak || Spacewatch || — || align=right data-sort-value="0.87" | 870 m || 
|-id=459 bgcolor=#fefefe
| 436459 ||  || — || November 22, 2006 || Mount Lemmon || Mount Lemmon Survey || V || align=right data-sort-value="0.44" | 440 m || 
|-id=460 bgcolor=#fefefe
| 436460 ||  || — || November 27, 2006 || Kitt Peak || Spacewatch || — || align=right data-sort-value="0.58" | 580 m || 
|-id=461 bgcolor=#fefefe
| 436461 ||  || — || February 22, 2011 || Kitt Peak || Spacewatch || NYS || align=right data-sort-value="0.68" | 680 m || 
|-id=462 bgcolor=#fefefe
| 436462 ||  || — || April 16, 2004 || Kitt Peak || Spacewatch || critical || align=right data-sort-value="0.71" | 710 m || 
|-id=463 bgcolor=#E9E9E9
| 436463 ||  || — || February 22, 2011 || Kitt Peak || Spacewatch || — || align=right | 1.0 km || 
|-id=464 bgcolor=#fefefe
| 436464 ||  || — || August 18, 2009 || Kitt Peak || Spacewatch || — || align=right data-sort-value="0.90" | 900 m || 
|-id=465 bgcolor=#fefefe
| 436465 ||  || — || August 28, 2005 || Kitt Peak || Spacewatch || — || align=right data-sort-value="0.78" | 780 m || 
|-id=466 bgcolor=#fefefe
| 436466 ||  || — || January 10, 2007 || Mount Lemmon || Mount Lemmon Survey || — || align=right data-sort-value="0.60" | 600 m || 
|-id=467 bgcolor=#fefefe
| 436467 ||  || — || November 22, 2006 || Kitt Peak || Spacewatch || — || align=right data-sort-value="0.62" | 620 m || 
|-id=468 bgcolor=#fefefe
| 436468 ||  || — || February 26, 2011 || Kitt Peak || Spacewatch || MAS || align=right data-sort-value="0.71" | 710 m || 
|-id=469 bgcolor=#fefefe
| 436469 ||  || — || April 12, 2004 || Anderson Mesa || LONEOS || — || align=right data-sort-value="0.82" | 820 m || 
|-id=470 bgcolor=#fefefe
| 436470 ||  || — || August 27, 2006 || Kitt Peak || Spacewatch || — || align=right data-sort-value="0.65" | 650 m || 
|-id=471 bgcolor=#fefefe
| 436471 ||  || — || August 20, 2009 || Kitt Peak || Spacewatch || — || align=right data-sort-value="0.71" | 710 m || 
|-id=472 bgcolor=#fefefe
| 436472 ||  || — || March 3, 2000 || Socorro || LINEAR || — || align=right data-sort-value="0.66" | 660 m || 
|-id=473 bgcolor=#fefefe
| 436473 ||  || — || April 21, 2004 || Campo Imperatore || CINEOS || MAS || align=right data-sort-value="0.61" | 610 m || 
|-id=474 bgcolor=#fefefe
| 436474 ||  || — || February 10, 2011 || Catalina || CSS || — || align=right | 1.0 km || 
|-id=475 bgcolor=#fefefe
| 436475 ||  || — || October 4, 2005 || Mount Lemmon || Mount Lemmon Survey || — || align=right data-sort-value="0.68" | 680 m || 
|-id=476 bgcolor=#fefefe
| 436476 ||  || — || April 13, 2004 || Kitt Peak || Spacewatch || MAS || align=right data-sort-value="0.68" | 680 m || 
|-id=477 bgcolor=#fefefe
| 436477 ||  || — || January 10, 2007 || Mount Lemmon || Mount Lemmon Survey || MAS || align=right data-sort-value="0.66" | 660 m || 
|-id=478 bgcolor=#fefefe
| 436478 ||  || — || March 18, 2004 || Socorro || LINEAR || — || align=right data-sort-value="0.87" | 870 m || 
|-id=479 bgcolor=#fefefe
| 436479 ||  || — || March 2, 2011 || Kitt Peak || Spacewatch || — || align=right data-sort-value="0.76" | 760 m || 
|-id=480 bgcolor=#fefefe
| 436480 ||  || — || February 22, 2011 || Kitt Peak || Spacewatch || NYS || align=right data-sort-value="0.60" | 600 m || 
|-id=481 bgcolor=#fefefe
| 436481 ||  || — || January 29, 2011 || Kitt Peak || Spacewatch || — || align=right data-sort-value="0.86" | 860 m || 
|-id=482 bgcolor=#fefefe
| 436482 ||  || — || January 8, 2011 || Mount Lemmon || Mount Lemmon Survey || — || align=right data-sort-value="0.75" | 750 m || 
|-id=483 bgcolor=#fefefe
| 436483 ||  || — || January 8, 2011 || Mount Lemmon || Mount Lemmon Survey || — || align=right data-sort-value="0.89" | 890 m || 
|-id=484 bgcolor=#fefefe
| 436484 ||  || — || December 5, 2010 || Mount Lemmon || Mount Lemmon Survey || NYS || align=right data-sort-value="0.64" | 640 m || 
|-id=485 bgcolor=#fefefe
| 436485 ||  || — || October 29, 2005 || Kitt Peak || Spacewatch || MAS || align=right data-sort-value="0.81" | 810 m || 
|-id=486 bgcolor=#E9E9E9
| 436486 ||  || — || March 5, 2011 || Kitt Peak || Spacewatch || — || align=right | 1.5 km || 
|-id=487 bgcolor=#fefefe
| 436487 ||  || — || October 1, 2005 || Mount Lemmon || Mount Lemmon Survey || NYS || align=right data-sort-value="0.65" | 650 m || 
|-id=488 bgcolor=#fefefe
| 436488 ||  || — || January 10, 2007 || Mount Lemmon || Mount Lemmon Survey || NYS || align=right data-sort-value="0.62" | 620 m || 
|-id=489 bgcolor=#fefefe
| 436489 ||  || — || March 6, 2011 || Kitt Peak || Spacewatch || — || align=right data-sort-value="0.95" | 950 m || 
|-id=490 bgcolor=#E9E9E9
| 436490 ||  || — || March 6, 2011 || Kitt Peak || Spacewatch || — || align=right data-sort-value="0.99" | 990 m || 
|-id=491 bgcolor=#fefefe
| 436491 ||  || — || September 18, 2009 || Kitt Peak || Spacewatch || — || align=right data-sort-value="0.84" | 840 m || 
|-id=492 bgcolor=#fefefe
| 436492 ||  || — || February 25, 2011 || Kitt Peak || Spacewatch || — || align=right data-sort-value="0.82" | 820 m || 
|-id=493 bgcolor=#fefefe
| 436493 ||  || — || February 25, 2011 || Kitt Peak || Spacewatch || — || align=right data-sort-value="0.70" | 700 m || 
|-id=494 bgcolor=#fefefe
| 436494 ||  || — || January 28, 2011 || Catalina || CSS || — || align=right data-sort-value="0.77" | 770 m || 
|-id=495 bgcolor=#E9E9E9
| 436495 ||  || — || January 22, 2006 || Mount Lemmon || Mount Lemmon Survey || — || align=right | 2.8 km || 
|-id=496 bgcolor=#fefefe
| 436496 ||  || — || February 22, 2011 || Kitt Peak || Spacewatch || — || align=right data-sort-value="0.94" | 940 m || 
|-id=497 bgcolor=#fefefe
| 436497 ||  || — || May 6, 2000 || Kitt Peak || Spacewatch || — || align=right data-sort-value="0.59" | 590 m || 
|-id=498 bgcolor=#fefefe
| 436498 ||  || — || March 6, 2011 || Mount Lemmon || Mount Lemmon Survey || (5026) || align=right data-sort-value="0.75" | 750 m || 
|-id=499 bgcolor=#fefefe
| 436499 ||  || — || December 15, 2006 || Kitt Peak || Spacewatch || MAS || align=right data-sort-value="0.68" | 680 m || 
|-id=500 bgcolor=#fefefe
| 436500 ||  || — || February 17, 2007 || Mount Lemmon || Mount Lemmon Survey || — || align=right data-sort-value="0.85" | 850 m || 
|}

436501–436600 

|-bgcolor=#fefefe
| 436501 ||  || — || August 18, 2009 || Kitt Peak || Spacewatch || — || align=right data-sort-value="0.88" | 880 m || 
|-id=502 bgcolor=#fefefe
| 436502 ||  || — || January 17, 2007 || Kitt Peak || Spacewatch || — || align=right | 1.0 km || 
|-id=503 bgcolor=#E9E9E9
| 436503 ||  || — || March 11, 2007 || Kitt Peak || Spacewatch || — || align=right data-sort-value="0.78" | 780 m || 
|-id=504 bgcolor=#fefefe
| 436504 ||  || — || February 11, 2011 || Mount Lemmon || Mount Lemmon Survey || — || align=right data-sort-value="0.76" | 760 m || 
|-id=505 bgcolor=#fefefe
| 436505 ||  || — || March 16, 2007 || Kitt Peak || Spacewatch || — || align=right data-sort-value="0.75" | 750 m || 
|-id=506 bgcolor=#E9E9E9
| 436506 ||  || — || January 30, 2011 || Kitt Peak || Spacewatch || — || align=right | 2.1 km || 
|-id=507 bgcolor=#fefefe
| 436507 ||  || — || March 18, 2004 || Kitt Peak || Spacewatch || V || align=right data-sort-value="0.74" | 740 m || 
|-id=508 bgcolor=#fefefe
| 436508 ||  || — || January 27, 2007 || Kitt Peak || Spacewatch || MAS || align=right data-sort-value="0.82" | 820 m || 
|-id=509 bgcolor=#fefefe
| 436509 ||  || — || January 17, 2007 || Kitt Peak || Spacewatch || NYS || align=right data-sort-value="0.60" | 600 m || 
|-id=510 bgcolor=#E9E9E9
| 436510 ||  || — || September 23, 2008 || Mount Lemmon || Mount Lemmon Survey || — || align=right data-sort-value="0.86" | 860 m || 
|-id=511 bgcolor=#fefefe
| 436511 ||  || — || November 21, 2006 || Mount Lemmon || Mount Lemmon Survey || — || align=right | 1.0 km || 
|-id=512 bgcolor=#E9E9E9
| 436512 ||  || — || March 11, 2007 || Kitt Peak || Spacewatch || — || align=right data-sort-value="0.86" | 860 m || 
|-id=513 bgcolor=#fefefe
| 436513 ||  || — || October 1, 2005 || Mount Lemmon || Mount Lemmon Survey || V || align=right data-sort-value="0.62" | 620 m || 
|-id=514 bgcolor=#fefefe
| 436514 ||  || — || November 4, 2005 || Kitt Peak || Spacewatch || NYS || align=right data-sort-value="0.66" | 660 m || 
|-id=515 bgcolor=#E9E9E9
| 436515 ||  || — || October 10, 2004 || Kitt Peak || Spacewatch || — || align=right | 1.1 km || 
|-id=516 bgcolor=#fefefe
| 436516 ||  || — || February 8, 2007 || Kitt Peak || Spacewatch || — || align=right | 1.1 km || 
|-id=517 bgcolor=#fefefe
| 436517 ||  || — || September 29, 2005 || Kitt Peak || Spacewatch || V || align=right data-sort-value="0.69" | 690 m || 
|-id=518 bgcolor=#fefefe
| 436518 ||  || — || February 22, 2007 || Catalina || CSS || — || align=right data-sort-value="0.79" | 790 m || 
|-id=519 bgcolor=#fefefe
| 436519 ||  || — || February 17, 2007 || Kitt Peak || Spacewatch || — || align=right data-sort-value="0.81" | 810 m || 
|-id=520 bgcolor=#fefefe
| 436520 ||  || — || March 2, 2011 || Kitt Peak || Spacewatch || — || align=right data-sort-value="0.74" | 740 m || 
|-id=521 bgcolor=#fefefe
| 436521 ||  || — || September 13, 2005 || Kitt Peak || Spacewatch || — || align=right data-sort-value="0.84" | 840 m || 
|-id=522 bgcolor=#E9E9E9
| 436522 ||  || — || March 8, 2011 || Kitt Peak || Spacewatch || — || align=right | 1.3 km || 
|-id=523 bgcolor=#E9E9E9
| 436523 ||  || — || April 26, 2007 || Mount Lemmon || Mount Lemmon Survey || EUN || align=right | 1.3 km || 
|-id=524 bgcolor=#fefefe
| 436524 ||  || — || December 28, 2002 || Kitt Peak || Spacewatch || — || align=right | 1.2 km || 
|-id=525 bgcolor=#fefefe
| 436525 ||  || — || May 5, 2008 || Mount Lemmon || Mount Lemmon Survey || — || align=right data-sort-value="0.61" | 610 m || 
|-id=526 bgcolor=#E9E9E9
| 436526 ||  || — || January 20, 2010 || WISE || WISE || — || align=right | 3.8 km || 
|-id=527 bgcolor=#fefefe
| 436527 ||  || — || November 22, 2006 || Mount Lemmon || Mount Lemmon Survey || NYS || align=right data-sort-value="0.56" | 560 m || 
|-id=528 bgcolor=#fefefe
| 436528 ||  || — || January 24, 2007 || Mount Lemmon || Mount Lemmon Survey || MAS || align=right data-sort-value="0.56" | 560 m || 
|-id=529 bgcolor=#E9E9E9
| 436529 ||  || — || March 24, 2011 || Kitt Peak || Spacewatch || — || align=right | 2.4 km || 
|-id=530 bgcolor=#E9E9E9
| 436530 ||  || — || March 27, 2011 || Kitt Peak || Spacewatch || — || align=right data-sort-value="0.79" | 790 m || 
|-id=531 bgcolor=#E9E9E9
| 436531 ||  || — || April 11, 2007 || Kitt Peak || Spacewatch || — || align=right data-sort-value="0.92" | 920 m || 
|-id=532 bgcolor=#E9E9E9
| 436532 ||  || — || March 27, 2011 || Mount Lemmon || Mount Lemmon Survey || — || align=right data-sort-value="0.92" | 920 m || 
|-id=533 bgcolor=#fefefe
| 436533 ||  || — || February 25, 2011 || Kitt Peak || Spacewatch || V || align=right data-sort-value="0.83" | 830 m || 
|-id=534 bgcolor=#E9E9E9
| 436534 ||  || — || October 8, 2008 || Kitt Peak || Spacewatch || — || align=right data-sort-value="0.91" | 910 m || 
|-id=535 bgcolor=#E9E9E9
| 436535 ||  || — || March 29, 2011 || Kitt Peak || Spacewatch || — || align=right | 1.2 km || 
|-id=536 bgcolor=#fefefe
| 436536 ||  || — || March 11, 2007 || Kitt Peak || Spacewatch || — || align=right | 1.1 km || 
|-id=537 bgcolor=#fefefe
| 436537 ||  || — || February 21, 2007 || Mount Lemmon || Mount Lemmon Survey || — || align=right data-sort-value="0.80" | 800 m || 
|-id=538 bgcolor=#fefefe
| 436538 ||  || — || September 6, 2008 || Mount Lemmon || Mount Lemmon Survey || — || align=right data-sort-value="0.65" | 650 m || 
|-id=539 bgcolor=#fefefe
| 436539 ||  || — || April 2, 2011 || Mount Lemmon || Mount Lemmon Survey || V || align=right data-sort-value="0.73" | 730 m || 
|-id=540 bgcolor=#fefefe
| 436540 ||  || — || October 28, 2005 || Mount Lemmon || Mount Lemmon Survey || — || align=right data-sort-value="0.86" | 860 m || 
|-id=541 bgcolor=#fefefe
| 436541 ||  || — || November 23, 2009 || Mount Lemmon || Mount Lemmon Survey || — || align=right data-sort-value="0.87" | 870 m || 
|-id=542 bgcolor=#fefefe
| 436542 ||  || — || April 5, 2000 || Socorro || LINEAR || MAS || align=right data-sort-value="0.75" | 750 m || 
|-id=543 bgcolor=#fefefe
| 436543 ||  || — || October 15, 2001 || Kitt Peak || Spacewatch || — || align=right data-sort-value="0.90" | 900 m || 
|-id=544 bgcolor=#E9E9E9
| 436544 ||  || — || April 2, 2011 || Kitt Peak || Spacewatch || — || align=right | 1.5 km || 
|-id=545 bgcolor=#E9E9E9
| 436545 ||  || — || March 13, 2011 || Mount Lemmon || Mount Lemmon Survey || — || align=right | 1.5 km || 
|-id=546 bgcolor=#E9E9E9
| 436546 ||  || — || March 28, 2011 || Mount Lemmon || Mount Lemmon Survey || — || align=right | 1.9 km || 
|-id=547 bgcolor=#E9E9E9
| 436547 ||  || — || May 1, 2003 || Kitt Peak || Spacewatch || — || align=right data-sort-value="0.89" | 890 m || 
|-id=548 bgcolor=#E9E9E9
| 436548 ||  || — || April 14, 2007 || Kitt Peak || Spacewatch || — || align=right data-sort-value="0.89" | 890 m || 
|-id=549 bgcolor=#E9E9E9
| 436549 ||  || — || September 15, 2004 || Kitt Peak || Spacewatch || — || align=right data-sort-value="0.99" | 990 m || 
|-id=550 bgcolor=#fefefe
| 436550 ||  || — || February 6, 2007 || Mount Lemmon || Mount Lemmon Survey || MAS || align=right data-sort-value="0.71" | 710 m || 
|-id=551 bgcolor=#E9E9E9
| 436551 ||  || — || April 23, 2007 || Kitt Peak || Spacewatch || — || align=right | 1.1 km || 
|-id=552 bgcolor=#fefefe
| 436552 ||  || — || January 16, 2011 || Mount Lemmon || Mount Lemmon Survey || — || align=right | 1.2 km || 
|-id=553 bgcolor=#fefefe
| 436553 ||  || — || April 3, 2011 || Haleakala || Pan-STARRS || — || align=right data-sort-value="0.86" | 860 m || 
|-id=554 bgcolor=#E9E9E9
| 436554 ||  || — || March 29, 2010 || WISE || WISE || KON || align=right | 3.2 km || 
|-id=555 bgcolor=#E9E9E9
| 436555 ||  || — || March 4, 2011 || Mount Lemmon || Mount Lemmon Survey || — || align=right data-sort-value="0.97" | 970 m || 
|-id=556 bgcolor=#E9E9E9
| 436556 ||  || — || May 13, 2007 || Mount Lemmon || Mount Lemmon Survey || MAR || align=right | 1.1 km || 
|-id=557 bgcolor=#fefefe
| 436557 ||  || — || February 17, 2007 || Kitt Peak || Spacewatch || MAScritical || align=right data-sort-value="0.65" | 650 m || 
|-id=558 bgcolor=#fefefe
| 436558 ||  || — || March 31, 2003 || Kitt Peak || Spacewatch || — || align=right data-sort-value="0.74" | 740 m || 
|-id=559 bgcolor=#fefefe
| 436559 ||  || — || March 19, 1996 || Kitt Peak || Spacewatch || — || align=right data-sort-value="0.78" | 780 m || 
|-id=560 bgcolor=#fefefe
| 436560 ||  || — || April 1, 2011 || Mount Lemmon || Mount Lemmon Survey || — || align=right data-sort-value="0.87" | 870 m || 
|-id=561 bgcolor=#E9E9E9
| 436561 ||  || — || December 12, 2004 || Catalina || CSS || — || align=right | 2.6 km || 
|-id=562 bgcolor=#fefefe
| 436562 ||  || — || February 23, 2007 || Kitt Peak || Spacewatch || MAS || align=right data-sort-value="0.83" | 830 m || 
|-id=563 bgcolor=#E9E9E9
| 436563 ||  || — || April 16, 2007 || Mount Lemmon || Mount Lemmon Survey || — || align=right data-sort-value="0.81" | 810 m || 
|-id=564 bgcolor=#E9E9E9
| 436564 ||  || — || March 28, 2011 || Kitt Peak || Spacewatch || — || align=right | 1.2 km || 
|-id=565 bgcolor=#E9E9E9
| 436565 ||  || — || April 27, 2011 || Kitt Peak || Spacewatch || — || align=right | 2.5 km || 
|-id=566 bgcolor=#E9E9E9
| 436566 ||  || — || April 15, 2007 || Kitt Peak || Spacewatch || — || align=right data-sort-value="0.97" | 970 m || 
|-id=567 bgcolor=#E9E9E9
| 436567 ||  || — || November 21, 2009 || Mount Lemmon || Mount Lemmon Survey || — || align=right | 2.0 km || 
|-id=568 bgcolor=#FFC2E0
| 436568 ||  || — || April 29, 2011 || Haleakala || Pan-STARRS || APO +1km || align=right | 1.2 km || 
|-id=569 bgcolor=#E9E9E9
| 436569 ||  || — || March 29, 2011 || Kitt Peak || Spacewatch || — || align=right | 1.1 km || 
|-id=570 bgcolor=#E9E9E9
| 436570 ||  || — || September 29, 2008 || Mount Lemmon || Mount Lemmon Survey || — || align=right | 2.2 km || 
|-id=571 bgcolor=#E9E9E9
| 436571 ||  || — || December 7, 2005 || Kitt Peak || Spacewatch || — || align=right | 1.1 km || 
|-id=572 bgcolor=#fefefe
| 436572 ||  || — || February 21, 2007 || Mount Lemmon || Mount Lemmon Survey || — || align=right data-sort-value="0.68" | 680 m || 
|-id=573 bgcolor=#fefefe
| 436573 ||  || — || November 2, 2005 || Mount Lemmon || Mount Lemmon Survey || V || align=right data-sort-value="0.72" | 720 m || 
|-id=574 bgcolor=#E9E9E9
| 436574 ||  || — || April 26, 2011 || Kitt Peak || Spacewatch || (5) || align=right data-sort-value="0.89" | 890 m || 
|-id=575 bgcolor=#E9E9E9
| 436575 ||  || — || November 18, 2008 || Kitt Peak || Spacewatch || — || align=right | 1.00 km || 
|-id=576 bgcolor=#E9E9E9
| 436576 ||  || — || June 7, 2007 || Kitt Peak || Spacewatch || — || align=right data-sort-value="0.90" | 900 m || 
|-id=577 bgcolor=#E9E9E9
| 436577 ||  || — || April 22, 2011 || Kitt Peak || Spacewatch || — || align=right | 1.3 km || 
|-id=578 bgcolor=#fefefe
| 436578 ||  || — || September 7, 2004 || Kitt Peak || Spacewatch || NYScritical || align=right data-sort-value="0.52" | 520 m || 
|-id=579 bgcolor=#E9E9E9
| 436579 ||  || — || September 16, 2003 || Kitt Peak || Spacewatch || — || align=right | 1.2 km || 
|-id=580 bgcolor=#E9E9E9
| 436580 ||  || — || April 29, 2011 || Kitt Peak || Spacewatch || — || align=right data-sort-value="0.86" | 860 m || 
|-id=581 bgcolor=#E9E9E9
| 436581 ||  || — || April 30, 2011 || Mount Lemmon || Mount Lemmon Survey || — || align=right data-sort-value="0.77" | 770 m || 
|-id=582 bgcolor=#fefefe
| 436582 ||  || — || April 2, 2011 || Kitt Peak || Spacewatch || — || align=right data-sort-value="0.95" | 950 m || 
|-id=583 bgcolor=#E9E9E9
| 436583 ||  || — || November 21, 2008 || Kitt Peak || Spacewatch || — || align=right | 1.3 km || 
|-id=584 bgcolor=#E9E9E9
| 436584 ||  || — || January 14, 2011 || Mount Lemmon || Mount Lemmon Survey || — || align=right | 1.0 km || 
|-id=585 bgcolor=#E9E9E9
| 436585 ||  || — || November 17, 2009 || Mount Lemmon || Mount Lemmon Survey || — || align=right | 1.4 km || 
|-id=586 bgcolor=#E9E9E9
| 436586 ||  || — || May 6, 2011 || Kitt Peak || Spacewatch || KON || align=right | 2.0 km || 
|-id=587 bgcolor=#E9E9E9
| 436587 ||  || — || April 28, 2011 || Kitt Peak || Spacewatch || EUN || align=right | 1.4 km || 
|-id=588 bgcolor=#E9E9E9
| 436588 ||  || — || September 11, 2004 || Socorro || LINEAR || — || align=right | 4.5 km || 
|-id=589 bgcolor=#E9E9E9
| 436589 ||  || — || April 30, 2011 || Kitt Peak || Spacewatch || EUN || align=right | 1.1 km || 
|-id=590 bgcolor=#E9E9E9
| 436590 ||  || — || December 31, 2008 || Mount Lemmon || Mount Lemmon Survey || — || align=right | 1.2 km || 
|-id=591 bgcolor=#E9E9E9
| 436591 ||  || — || September 24, 2008 || Mount Lemmon || Mount Lemmon Survey || — || align=right | 1.6 km || 
|-id=592 bgcolor=#E9E9E9
| 436592 ||  || — || March 29, 2011 || Kitt Peak || Spacewatch || EUN || align=right | 1.4 km || 
|-id=593 bgcolor=#E9E9E9
| 436593 ||  || — || November 8, 2008 || Kitt Peak || Spacewatch || — || align=right | 1.6 km || 
|-id=594 bgcolor=#E9E9E9
| 436594 ||  || — || June 14, 2007 || Kitt Peak || Spacewatch || — || align=right data-sort-value="0.97" | 970 m || 
|-id=595 bgcolor=#E9E9E9
| 436595 ||  || — || January 9, 2006 || Kitt Peak || Spacewatch || — || align=right | 1.3 km || 
|-id=596 bgcolor=#E9E9E9
| 436596 ||  || — || October 12, 1996 || Kitt Peak || Spacewatch || — || align=right | 1.3 km || 
|-id=597 bgcolor=#E9E9E9
| 436597 ||  || — || June 6, 2003 || Kitt Peak || Spacewatch || — || align=right | 1.2 km || 
|-id=598 bgcolor=#E9E9E9
| 436598 ||  || — || March 15, 2007 || Mount Lemmon || Mount Lemmon Survey || — || align=right | 1.3 km || 
|-id=599 bgcolor=#E9E9E9
| 436599 ||  || — || November 19, 2008 || Catalina || CSS || MAR || align=right | 1.4 km || 
|-id=600 bgcolor=#E9E9E9
| 436600 ||  || — || October 10, 2008 || Mount Lemmon || Mount Lemmon Survey || MAR || align=right | 1.2 km || 
|}

436601–436700 

|-bgcolor=#E9E9E9
| 436601 ||  || — || December 24, 2005 || Kitt Peak || Spacewatch || (5) || align=right data-sort-value="0.82" | 820 m || 
|-id=602 bgcolor=#E9E9E9
| 436602 ||  || — || November 11, 2004 || Kitt Peak || Spacewatch || — || align=right | 2.0 km || 
|-id=603 bgcolor=#E9E9E9
| 436603 ||  || — || November 11, 2004 || Kitt Peak || Spacewatch || EUN || align=right | 1.6 km || 
|-id=604 bgcolor=#E9E9E9
| 436604 ||  || — || May 23, 2011 || Mount Lemmon || Mount Lemmon Survey || — || align=right | 1.9 km || 
|-id=605 bgcolor=#E9E9E9
| 436605 ||  || — || January 7, 2010 || Mount Lemmon || Mount Lemmon Survey || GEF || align=right | 1.3 km || 
|-id=606 bgcolor=#d6d6d6
| 436606 ||  || — || October 5, 2007 || Kitt Peak || Spacewatch || — || align=right | 3.3 km || 
|-id=607 bgcolor=#E9E9E9
| 436607 ||  || — || September 15, 2007 || Kitt Peak || Spacewatch || AGN || align=right | 1.2 km || 
|-id=608 bgcolor=#E9E9E9
| 436608 ||  || — || May 9, 2007 || Kitt Peak || Spacewatch || — || align=right data-sort-value="0.76" | 760 m || 
|-id=609 bgcolor=#E9E9E9
| 436609 ||  || — || October 27, 2008 || Mount Lemmon || Mount Lemmon Survey || RAF || align=right | 1.0 km || 
|-id=610 bgcolor=#E9E9E9
| 436610 ||  || — || May 11, 2011 || Kitt Peak || Spacewatch || — || align=right | 1.3 km || 
|-id=611 bgcolor=#E9E9E9
| 436611 ||  || — || November 10, 2004 || Kitt Peak || Spacewatch || — || align=right | 1.2 km || 
|-id=612 bgcolor=#E9E9E9
| 436612 ||  || — || May 10, 2007 || Mount Lemmon || Mount Lemmon Survey || — || align=right data-sort-value="0.80" | 800 m || 
|-id=613 bgcolor=#E9E9E9
| 436613 ||  || — || September 20, 1995 || Kitt Peak || Spacewatch || — || align=right data-sort-value="0.96" | 960 m || 
|-id=614 bgcolor=#E9E9E9
| 436614 ||  || — || December 30, 2005 || Kitt Peak || Spacewatch || — || align=right data-sort-value="0.97" | 970 m || 
|-id=615 bgcolor=#E9E9E9
| 436615 ||  || — || September 24, 2008 || Kitt Peak || Spacewatch || — || align=right | 1.2 km || 
|-id=616 bgcolor=#FA8072
| 436616 ||  || — || September 11, 2007 || Catalina || CSS || — || align=right | 1.4 km || 
|-id=617 bgcolor=#E9E9E9
| 436617 ||  || — || June 3, 2011 || Mount Lemmon || Mount Lemmon Survey || — || align=right | 1.5 km || 
|-id=618 bgcolor=#d6d6d6
| 436618 ||  || — || September 27, 2006 || Mount Lemmon || Mount Lemmon Survey || — || align=right | 4.3 km || 
|-id=619 bgcolor=#fefefe
| 436619 ||  || — || April 18, 2007 || Kitt Peak || Spacewatch || — || align=right data-sort-value="0.75" | 750 m || 
|-id=620 bgcolor=#E9E9E9
| 436620 ||  || — || November 1, 2008 || Mount Lemmon || Mount Lemmon Survey || — || align=right | 1.0 km || 
|-id=621 bgcolor=#E9E9E9
| 436621 ||  || — || June 3, 2011 || Mount Lemmon || Mount Lemmon Survey || — || align=right | 1.6 km || 
|-id=622 bgcolor=#E9E9E9
| 436622 ||  || — || April 27, 2011 || Mount Lemmon || Mount Lemmon Survey || — || align=right | 1.5 km || 
|-id=623 bgcolor=#E9E9E9
| 436623 ||  || — || September 30, 2009 || Mount Lemmon || Mount Lemmon Survey || — || align=right | 2.1 km || 
|-id=624 bgcolor=#E9E9E9
| 436624 ||  || — || June 25, 2011 || Mount Lemmon || Mount Lemmon Survey || — || align=right | 1.7 km || 
|-id=625 bgcolor=#E9E9E9
| 436625 ||  || — || February 16, 2010 || Mount Lemmon || Mount Lemmon Survey || JUN || align=right | 1.1 km || 
|-id=626 bgcolor=#fefefe
| 436626 ||  || — || November 21, 2008 || Kitt Peak || Spacewatch || — || align=right | 1.2 km || 
|-id=627 bgcolor=#E9E9E9
| 436627 ||  || — || September 13, 2007 || Catalina || CSS || JUN || align=right | 1.4 km || 
|-id=628 bgcolor=#d6d6d6
| 436628 ||  || — || November 12, 2007 || Mount Lemmon || Mount Lemmon Survey || EOS || align=right | 1.9 km || 
|-id=629 bgcolor=#d6d6d6
| 436629 ||  || — || August 28, 2006 || Catalina || CSS || — || align=right | 2.5 km || 
|-id=630 bgcolor=#d6d6d6
| 436630 ||  || — || September 10, 2001 || Anderson Mesa || LONEOS || — || align=right | 2.6 km || 
|-id=631 bgcolor=#E9E9E9
| 436631 ||  || — || March 18, 2010 || Kitt Peak || Spacewatch || — || align=right | 2.2 km || 
|-id=632 bgcolor=#E9E9E9
| 436632 ||  || — || March 29, 2001 || Kitt Peak || Spacewatch || — || align=right | 2.2 km || 
|-id=633 bgcolor=#E9E9E9
| 436633 ||  || — || October 15, 2007 || Mount Lemmon || Mount Lemmon Survey || — || align=right | 2.1 km || 
|-id=634 bgcolor=#d6d6d6
| 436634 ||  || — || August 2, 2010 || WISE || WISE || — || align=right | 5.5 km || 
|-id=635 bgcolor=#d6d6d6
| 436635 ||  || — || September 25, 2001 || Socorro || LINEAR || — || align=right | 3.0 km || 
|-id=636 bgcolor=#d6d6d6
| 436636 ||  || — || January 18, 2009 || Mount Lemmon || Mount Lemmon Survey || EOS || align=right | 2.0 km || 
|-id=637 bgcolor=#E9E9E9
| 436637 ||  || — || May 30, 2006 || Mount Lemmon || Mount Lemmon Survey || — || align=right | 1.9 km || 
|-id=638 bgcolor=#d6d6d6
| 436638 ||  || — || March 17, 2004 || Kitt Peak || Spacewatch || — || align=right | 2.7 km || 
|-id=639 bgcolor=#E9E9E9
| 436639 ||  || — || October 4, 2002 || Socorro || LINEAR || — || align=right | 2.1 km || 
|-id=640 bgcolor=#d6d6d6
| 436640 ||  || — || September 26, 2006 || Mount Lemmon || Mount Lemmon Survey || EOS || align=right | 1.8 km || 
|-id=641 bgcolor=#d6d6d6
| 436641 ||  || — || May 31, 2011 || Mount Lemmon || Mount Lemmon Survey || — || align=right | 3.3 km || 
|-id=642 bgcolor=#d6d6d6
| 436642 ||  || — || September 17, 2006 || Kitt Peak || Spacewatch || — || align=right | 2.2 km || 
|-id=643 bgcolor=#d6d6d6
| 436643 ||  || — || August 19, 2011 || Haleakala || Pan-STARRS || EOS || align=right | 2.4 km || 
|-id=644 bgcolor=#d6d6d6
| 436644 ||  || — || February 19, 2009 || Kitt Peak || Spacewatch || — || align=right | 2.9 km || 
|-id=645 bgcolor=#d6d6d6
| 436645 ||  || — || April 11, 2005 || Mount Lemmon || Mount Lemmon Survey || — || align=right | 3.0 km || 
|-id=646 bgcolor=#d6d6d6
| 436646 ||  || — || August 24, 2011 || XuYi || PMO NEO || EOS || align=right | 2.3 km || 
|-id=647 bgcolor=#d6d6d6
| 436647 ||  || — || September 30, 2006 || Mount Lemmon || Mount Lemmon Survey || THM || align=right | 2.3 km || 
|-id=648 bgcolor=#d6d6d6
| 436648 ||  || — || December 3, 2007 || Kitt Peak || Spacewatch || VER || align=right | 3.2 km || 
|-id=649 bgcolor=#d6d6d6
| 436649 ||  || — || July 29, 2010 || WISE || WISE || — || align=right | 3.1 km || 
|-id=650 bgcolor=#d6d6d6
| 436650 ||  || — || May 13, 2010 || Kitt Peak || Spacewatch || — || align=right | 2.4 km || 
|-id=651 bgcolor=#E9E9E9
| 436651 ||  || — || November 5, 2007 || Kitt Peak || Spacewatch ||  || align=right | 2.8 km || 
|-id=652 bgcolor=#E9E9E9
| 436652 ||  || — || September 14, 1998 || Xinglong || SCAP || — || align=right | 2.1 km || 
|-id=653 bgcolor=#d6d6d6
| 436653 ||  || — || April 19, 2009 || Mount Lemmon || Mount Lemmon Survey || — || align=right | 3.1 km || 
|-id=654 bgcolor=#FFC2E0
| 436654 ||  || — || September 8, 2011 || La Sagra || OAM Obs. || AMO || align=right data-sort-value="0.51" | 510 m || 
|-id=655 bgcolor=#d6d6d6
| 436655 ||  || — || March 10, 2005 || Mount Lemmon || Mount Lemmon Survey || — || align=right | 2.1 km || 
|-id=656 bgcolor=#d6d6d6
| 436656 ||  || — || September 24, 2000 || Socorro || LINEAR || — || align=right | 3.5 km || 
|-id=657 bgcolor=#d6d6d6
| 436657 ||  || — || September 17, 2006 || Kitt Peak || Spacewatch || EOS || align=right | 1.5 km || 
|-id=658 bgcolor=#d6d6d6
| 436658 ||  || — || November 23, 2006 || Kitt Peak || Spacewatch || — || align=right | 2.7 km || 
|-id=659 bgcolor=#d6d6d6
| 436659 ||  || — || August 29, 2005 || Kitt Peak || Spacewatch || — || align=right | 3.1 km || 
|-id=660 bgcolor=#d6d6d6
| 436660 ||  || — || October 31, 2006 || Kitt Peak || Spacewatch || — || align=right | 3.2 km || 
|-id=661 bgcolor=#d6d6d6
| 436661 ||  || — || March 1, 2010 || WISE || WISE || — || align=right | 3.2 km || 
|-id=662 bgcolor=#d6d6d6
| 436662 ||  || — || June 19, 2010 || Mount Lemmon || Mount Lemmon Survey || — || align=right | 3.2 km || 
|-id=663 bgcolor=#E9E9E9
| 436663 ||  || — || June 9, 2011 || Haleakala || Pan-STARRS || EUN || align=right | 1.3 km || 
|-id=664 bgcolor=#d6d6d6
| 436664 ||  || — || March 17, 2009 || Kitt Peak || Spacewatch || — || align=right | 2.6 km || 
|-id=665 bgcolor=#d6d6d6
| 436665 ||  || — || March 21, 2009 || Mount Lemmon || Mount Lemmon Survey || EOS || align=right | 1.6 km || 
|-id=666 bgcolor=#d6d6d6
| 436666 ||  || — || October 23, 2006 || Mount Lemmon || Mount Lemmon Survey || — || align=right | 2.8 km || 
|-id=667 bgcolor=#d6d6d6
| 436667 ||  || — || January 18, 2009 || Kitt Peak || Spacewatch || — || align=right | 2.4 km || 
|-id=668 bgcolor=#d6d6d6
| 436668 ||  || — || October 15, 2004 || Mount Lemmon || Mount Lemmon Survey || 3:2 || align=right | 4.4 km || 
|-id=669 bgcolor=#d6d6d6
| 436669 ||  || — || November 17, 2006 || Mount Lemmon || Mount Lemmon Survey || — || align=right | 3.3 km || 
|-id=670 bgcolor=#d6d6d6
| 436670 ||  || — || April 10, 2010 || Mount Lemmon || Mount Lemmon Survey || — || align=right | 2.5 km || 
|-id=671 bgcolor=#FFC2E0
| 436671 ||  || — || September 24, 2011 || Haleakala || Pan-STARRS || AMO +1kmPHA || align=right | 2.2 km || 
|-id=672 bgcolor=#d6d6d6
| 436672 ||  || — || November 23, 2006 || Mount Lemmon || Mount Lemmon Survey || — || align=right | 3.0 km || 
|-id=673 bgcolor=#d6d6d6
| 436673 ||  || — || January 13, 2002 || Kitt Peak || Spacewatch || — || align=right | 4.0 km || 
|-id=674 bgcolor=#d6d6d6
| 436674 ||  || — || December 6, 2007 || Kitt Peak || Spacewatch || — || align=right | 2.8 km || 
|-id=675 bgcolor=#d6d6d6
| 436675 ||  || — || September 9, 2011 || Kitt Peak || Spacewatch || — || align=right | 3.2 km || 
|-id=676 bgcolor=#d6d6d6
| 436676 ||  || — || February 20, 2009 || Kitt Peak || Spacewatch || EMA || align=right | 3.4 km || 
|-id=677 bgcolor=#d6d6d6
| 436677 ||  || — || February 10, 2008 || Mount Lemmon || Mount Lemmon Survey || VER || align=right | 2.5 km || 
|-id=678 bgcolor=#d6d6d6
| 436678 ||  || — || May 14, 2004 || Kitt Peak || Spacewatch || — || align=right | 3.0 km || 
|-id=679 bgcolor=#d6d6d6
| 436679 ||  || — || September 20, 2011 || Kitt Peak || Spacewatch || HYG || align=right | 2.8 km || 
|-id=680 bgcolor=#d6d6d6
| 436680 ||  || — || October 3, 2006 || Mount Lemmon || Mount Lemmon Survey || EOS || align=right | 1.7 km || 
|-id=681 bgcolor=#d6d6d6
| 436681 ||  || — || March 4, 2008 || Kitt Peak || Spacewatch || 7:4 || align=right | 3.5 km || 
|-id=682 bgcolor=#d6d6d6
| 436682 ||  || — || May 14, 2010 || Mount Lemmon || Mount Lemmon Survey || — || align=right | 2.9 km || 
|-id=683 bgcolor=#d6d6d6
| 436683 ||  || — || September 26, 2011 || Kitt Peak || Spacewatch || — || align=right | 2.8 km || 
|-id=684 bgcolor=#d6d6d6
| 436684 ||  || — || February 9, 2008 || Kitt Peak || Spacewatch || — || align=right | 2.9 km || 
|-id=685 bgcolor=#d6d6d6
| 436685 ||  || — || November 16, 2006 || Kitt Peak || Spacewatch || — || align=right | 2.6 km || 
|-id=686 bgcolor=#d6d6d6
| 436686 ||  || — || July 6, 2005 || Kitt Peak || Spacewatch || — || align=right | 2.5 km || 
|-id=687 bgcolor=#d6d6d6
| 436687 ||  || — || September 30, 2006 || Mount Lemmon || Mount Lemmon Survey || — || align=right | 2.4 km || 
|-id=688 bgcolor=#d6d6d6
| 436688 ||  || — || November 12, 2006 || Mount Lemmon || Mount Lemmon Survey || — || align=right | 3.0 km || 
|-id=689 bgcolor=#d6d6d6
| 436689 ||  || — || September 15, 2006 || Kitt Peak || Spacewatch || — || align=right | 2.3 km || 
|-id=690 bgcolor=#d6d6d6
| 436690 ||  || — || September 18, 2011 || Mount Lemmon || Mount Lemmon Survey || — || align=right | 2.2 km || 
|-id=691 bgcolor=#d6d6d6
| 436691 ||  || — || October 20, 2006 || Kitt Peak || Spacewatch || — || align=right | 2.5 km || 
|-id=692 bgcolor=#d6d6d6
| 436692 ||  || — || September 15, 2006 || Kitt Peak || Spacewatch || — || align=right | 2.5 km || 
|-id=693 bgcolor=#d6d6d6
| 436693 ||  || — || September 29, 2005 || Mount Lemmon || Mount Lemmon Survey || — || align=right | 4.3 km || 
|-id=694 bgcolor=#d6d6d6
| 436694 ||  || — || April 22, 2004 || Kitt Peak || Spacewatch || — || align=right | 3.0 km || 
|-id=695 bgcolor=#d6d6d6
| 436695 ||  || — || September 5, 2005 || Siding Spring || SSS || Tj (2.98) || align=right | 4.2 km || 
|-id=696 bgcolor=#d6d6d6
| 436696 ||  || — || August 28, 2005 || Kitt Peak || Spacewatch || — || align=right | 2.8 km || 
|-id=697 bgcolor=#d6d6d6
| 436697 ||  || — || September 14, 2005 || Kitt Peak || Spacewatch || — || align=right | 2.9 km || 
|-id=698 bgcolor=#d6d6d6
| 436698 ||  || — || April 2, 2009 || Mount Lemmon || Mount Lemmon Survey || — || align=right | 3.9 km || 
|-id=699 bgcolor=#d6d6d6
| 436699 ||  || — || February 21, 2010 || WISE || WISE || — || align=right | 3.7 km || 
|-id=700 bgcolor=#d6d6d6
| 436700 ||  || — || September 30, 2006 || Mount Lemmon || Mount Lemmon Survey || — || align=right | 2.4 km || 
|}

436701–436800 

|-bgcolor=#d6d6d6
| 436701 ||  || — || April 16, 2010 || WISE || WISE || — || align=right | 3.5 km || 
|-id=702 bgcolor=#d6d6d6
| 436702 ||  || — || August 31, 2000 || Socorro || LINEAR || — || align=right | 4.4 km || 
|-id=703 bgcolor=#d6d6d6
| 436703 ||  || — || July 1, 2011 || Mount Lemmon || Mount Lemmon Survey || — || align=right | 3.0 km || 
|-id=704 bgcolor=#d6d6d6
| 436704 ||  || — || March 30, 2010 || WISE || WISE || — || align=right | 3.3 km || 
|-id=705 bgcolor=#d6d6d6
| 436705 ||  || — || April 3, 2010 || WISE || WISE || — || align=right | 4.0 km || 
|-id=706 bgcolor=#d6d6d6
| 436706 ||  || — || April 4, 2010 || WISE || WISE || — || align=right | 4.2 km || 
|-id=707 bgcolor=#d6d6d6
| 436707 ||  || — || October 26, 2000 || Kitt Peak || Spacewatch || — || align=right | 3.1 km || 
|-id=708 bgcolor=#d6d6d6
| 436708 ||  || — || November 18, 2006 || Kitt Peak || Spacewatch || — || align=right | 2.8 km || 
|-id=709 bgcolor=#d6d6d6
| 436709 ||  || — || August 10, 2005 || Siding Spring || SSS || — || align=right | 3.9 km || 
|-id=710 bgcolor=#d6d6d6
| 436710 ||  || — || March 16, 2009 || Kitt Peak || Spacewatch || — || align=right | 3.9 km || 
|-id=711 bgcolor=#d6d6d6
| 436711 ||  || — || August 27, 2005 || Anderson Mesa || LONEOS || — || align=right | 3.4 km || 
|-id=712 bgcolor=#d6d6d6
| 436712 ||  || — || September 12, 2005 || Kitt Peak || Spacewatch || THM || align=right | 2.3 km || 
|-id=713 bgcolor=#d6d6d6
| 436713 ||  || — || December 14, 2006 || Mount Lemmon || Mount Lemmon Survey || — || align=right | 2.5 km || 
|-id=714 bgcolor=#d6d6d6
| 436714 ||  || — || April 22, 2004 || Kitt Peak || Spacewatch || — || align=right | 3.1 km || 
|-id=715 bgcolor=#d6d6d6
| 436715 ||  || — || November 19, 2006 || Kitt Peak || Spacewatch || — || align=right | 3.1 km || 
|-id=716 bgcolor=#d6d6d6
| 436716 ||  || — || November 11, 2006 || Kitt Peak || Spacewatch || — || align=right | 2.7 km || 
|-id=717 bgcolor=#d6d6d6
| 436717 ||  || — || October 20, 2011 || Kitt Peak || Spacewatch || — || align=right | 3.1 km || 
|-id=718 bgcolor=#d6d6d6
| 436718 ||  || — || September 30, 2005 || Mount Lemmon || Mount Lemmon Survey || — || align=right | 3.7 km || 
|-id=719 bgcolor=#d6d6d6
| 436719 ||  || — || November 17, 2006 || Mount Lemmon || Mount Lemmon Survey || — || align=right | 2.6 km || 
|-id=720 bgcolor=#d6d6d6
| 436720 ||  || — || October 17, 2006 || Mount Lemmon || Mount Lemmon Survey || — || align=right | 2.7 km || 
|-id=721 bgcolor=#d6d6d6
| 436721 ||  || — || November 20, 2006 || Mount Lemmon || Mount Lemmon Survey || — || align=right | 3.8 km || 
|-id=722 bgcolor=#d6d6d6
| 436722 ||  || — || October 20, 2011 || Mount Lemmon || Mount Lemmon Survey || — || align=right | 2.8 km || 
|-id=723 bgcolor=#d6d6d6
| 436723 ||  || — || September 7, 2011 || Kitt Peak || Spacewatch || — || align=right | 2.8 km || 
|-id=724 bgcolor=#FFC2E0
| 436724 ||  || — || October 25, 2011 || Haleakala || Pan-STARRS || APOPHAfast || align=right data-sort-value="0.38" | 380 m || 
|-id=725 bgcolor=#d6d6d6
| 436725 ||  || — || August 31, 2005 || Kitt Peak || Spacewatch || — || align=right | 3.5 km || 
|-id=726 bgcolor=#d6d6d6
| 436726 ||  || — || January 13, 2008 || Mount Lemmon || Mount Lemmon Survey || — || align=right | 4.5 km || 
|-id=727 bgcolor=#d6d6d6
| 436727 ||  || — || October 23, 2006 || Kitt Peak || Spacewatch || — || align=right | 3.0 km || 
|-id=728 bgcolor=#d6d6d6
| 436728 ||  || — || October 6, 2011 || Mount Lemmon || Mount Lemmon Survey || 7:4 || align=right | 3.4 km || 
|-id=729 bgcolor=#d6d6d6
| 436729 ||  || — || September 23, 2000 || Anderson Mesa || LONEOS || — || align=right | 2.8 km || 
|-id=730 bgcolor=#d6d6d6
| 436730 ||  || — || September 24, 2000 || Kitt Peak || Spacewatch || — || align=right | 3.4 km || 
|-id=731 bgcolor=#d6d6d6
| 436731 ||  || — || November 20, 2001 || Socorro || LINEAR || — || align=right | 2.7 km || 
|-id=732 bgcolor=#d6d6d6
| 436732 ||  || — || April 21, 2004 || Kitt Peak || Spacewatch || Tj (2.99) || align=right | 2.8 km || 
|-id=733 bgcolor=#d6d6d6
| 436733 ||  || — || December 15, 2006 || Kitt Peak || Spacewatch || — || align=right | 3.2 km || 
|-id=734 bgcolor=#d6d6d6
| 436734 ||  || — || September 20, 2011 || Kitt Peak || Spacewatch || ELF || align=right | 2.7 km || 
|-id=735 bgcolor=#d6d6d6
| 436735 ||  || — || December 2, 1994 || Kitt Peak || Spacewatch || — || align=right | 3.5 km || 
|-id=736 bgcolor=#d6d6d6
| 436736 ||  || — || February 9, 2008 || Kitt Peak || Spacewatch || — || align=right | 2.9 km || 
|-id=737 bgcolor=#d6d6d6
| 436737 ||  || — || September 20, 2011 || Kitt Peak || Spacewatch || — || align=right | 2.9 km || 
|-id=738 bgcolor=#d6d6d6
| 436738 ||  || — || April 20, 2010 || WISE || WISE || — || align=right | 3.0 km || 
|-id=739 bgcolor=#d6d6d6
| 436739 ||  || — || August 6, 2005 || Siding Spring || SSS || — || align=right | 4.3 km || 
|-id=740 bgcolor=#d6d6d6
| 436740 ||  || — || September 25, 2005 || Kitt Peak || Spacewatch || — || align=right | 3.1 km || 
|-id=741 bgcolor=#d6d6d6
| 436741 ||  || — || May 13, 2004 || Kitt Peak || Spacewatch || — || align=right | 4.2 km || 
|-id=742 bgcolor=#d6d6d6
| 436742 ||  || — || March 25, 2010 || WISE || WISE || — || align=right | 3.2 km || 
|-id=743 bgcolor=#d6d6d6
| 436743 ||  || — || November 17, 2006 || Kitt Peak || Spacewatch || — || align=right | 2.6 km || 
|-id=744 bgcolor=#fefefe
| 436744 ||  || — || December 19, 2003 || Socorro || LINEAR || H || align=right data-sort-value="0.71" | 710 m || 
|-id=745 bgcolor=#d6d6d6
| 436745 ||  || — || June 13, 2004 || Kitt Peak || Spacewatch || — || align=right | 3.4 km || 
|-id=746 bgcolor=#d6d6d6
| 436746 ||  || — || May 19, 2010 || WISE || WISE || — || align=right | 5.0 km || 
|-id=747 bgcolor=#fefefe
| 436747 ||  || — || May 10, 2005 || Catalina || CSS || H || align=right data-sort-value="0.85" | 850 m || 
|-id=748 bgcolor=#fefefe
| 436748 ||  || — || November 16, 2006 || Mount Lemmon || Mount Lemmon Survey || H || align=right data-sort-value="0.78" | 780 m || 
|-id=749 bgcolor=#fefefe
| 436749 ||  || — || June 6, 2005 || Kitt Peak || Spacewatch || H || align=right data-sort-value="0.76" | 760 m || 
|-id=750 bgcolor=#d6d6d6
| 436750 ||  || — || December 17, 2001 || Kitt Peak || Spacewatch || — || align=right | 3.7 km || 
|-id=751 bgcolor=#fefefe
| 436751 ||  || — || May 13, 2005 || Campo Imperatore || CINEOS || H || align=right data-sort-value="0.71" | 710 m || 
|-id=752 bgcolor=#C2FFFF
| 436752 ||  || — || November 30, 2011 || Kitt Peak || Spacewatch || L4 || align=right | 11 km || 
|-id=753 bgcolor=#fefefe
| 436753 ||  || — || April 14, 2010 || Mount Lemmon || Mount Lemmon Survey || H || align=right data-sort-value="0.55" | 550 m || 
|-id=754 bgcolor=#C2FFFF
| 436754 ||  || — || June 4, 2006 || Kitt Peak || Spacewatch || L4 || align=right | 11 km || 
|-id=755 bgcolor=#C2FFFF
| 436755 ||  || — || November 8, 2010 || Mount Lemmon || Mount Lemmon Survey || L4 || align=right | 7.9 km || 
|-id=756 bgcolor=#C2FFFF
| 436756 ||  || — || December 15, 2010 || Mount Lemmon || Mount Lemmon Survey || L4 || align=right | 7.9 km || 
|-id=757 bgcolor=#fefefe
| 436757 ||  || — || June 10, 2010 || Mount Lemmon || Mount Lemmon Survey || H || align=right data-sort-value="0.87" | 870 m || 
|-id=758 bgcolor=#C2FFFF
| 436758 ||  || — || January 18, 2010 || WISE || WISE || L4 || align=right | 8.6 km || 
|-id=759 bgcolor=#fefefe
| 436759 ||  || — || April 11, 2010 || Mount Lemmon || Mount Lemmon Survey || H || align=right data-sort-value="0.58" | 580 m || 
|-id=760 bgcolor=#C2FFFF
| 436760 ||  || — || January 28, 2000 || Kitt Peak || Spacewatch || L4 || align=right | 8.6 km || 
|-id=761 bgcolor=#FFC2E0
| 436761 ||  || — || February 16, 2012 || Haleakala || Pan-STARRS || APO +1km || align=right | 2.8 km || 
|-id=762 bgcolor=#fefefe
| 436762 ||  || — || October 1, 2005 || Mount Lemmon || Mount Lemmon Survey || H || align=right data-sort-value="0.75" | 750 m || 
|-id=763 bgcolor=#FFC2E0
| 436763 ||  || — || March 26, 2012 || Catalina || CSS || APO +1km || align=right data-sort-value="0.89" | 890 m || 
|-id=764 bgcolor=#FFC2E0
| 436764 ||  || — || November 2, 2008 || Mount Lemmon || Mount Lemmon Survey || AMOcritical || align=right data-sort-value="0.47" | 470 m || 
|-id=765 bgcolor=#fefefe
| 436765 ||  || — || January 18, 2009 || Kitt Peak || Spacewatch || H || align=right data-sort-value="0.57" | 570 m || 
|-id=766 bgcolor=#fefefe
| 436766 ||  || — || April 12, 2004 || Socorro || LINEAR || H || align=right data-sort-value="0.86" | 860 m || 
|-id=767 bgcolor=#fefefe
| 436767 ||  || — || April 14, 2004 || Kitt Peak || Spacewatch || H || align=right data-sort-value="0.73" | 730 m || 
|-id=768 bgcolor=#fefefe
| 436768 ||  || — || February 19, 2009 || Catalina || CSS || H || align=right data-sort-value="0.84" | 840 m || 
|-id=769 bgcolor=#fefefe
| 436769 ||  || — || March 28, 2012 || Kitt Peak || Spacewatch || — || align=right data-sort-value="0.49" | 490 m || 
|-id=770 bgcolor=#fefefe
| 436770 ||  || — || January 11, 2008 || Mount Lemmon || Mount Lemmon Survey || — || align=right data-sort-value="0.64" | 640 m || 
|-id=771 bgcolor=#FFC2E0
| 436771 ||  || — || May 12, 2012 || Mount Lemmon || Mount Lemmon Survey || ATEcritical || align=right data-sort-value="0.56" | 560 m || 
|-id=772 bgcolor=#fefefe
| 436772 ||  || — || March 16, 2012 || Mount Lemmon || Mount Lemmon Survey || — || align=right data-sort-value="0.66" | 660 m || 
|-id=773 bgcolor=#fefefe
| 436773 ||  || — || April 9, 2005 || Mount Lemmon || Mount Lemmon Survey || — || align=right data-sort-value="0.62" | 620 m || 
|-id=774 bgcolor=#FFC2E0
| 436774 ||  || — || May 16, 2012 || Catalina || CSS || APOPHA || align=right data-sort-value="0.72" | 720 m || 
|-id=775 bgcolor=#FFC2E0
| 436775 ||  || — || June 8, 2012 || Catalina || CSS || APO +1km || align=right | 1.8 km || 
|-id=776 bgcolor=#FA8072
| 436776 ||  || — || August 29, 2006 || Kitt Peak || Spacewatch || — || align=right data-sort-value="0.35" | 350 m || 
|-id=777 bgcolor=#FA8072
| 436777 ||  || — || August 15, 2005 || Siding Spring || SSS || — || align=right data-sort-value="0.69" | 690 m || 
|-id=778 bgcolor=#fefefe
| 436778 ||  || — || April 7, 2008 || Mount Lemmon || Mount Lemmon Survey || — || align=right data-sort-value="0.68" | 680 m || 
|-id=779 bgcolor=#fefefe
| 436779 ||  || — || October 22, 2006 || Kitt Peak || Spacewatch || — || align=right data-sort-value="0.67" | 670 m || 
|-id=780 bgcolor=#fefefe
| 436780 ||  || — || March 12, 2005 || Kitt Peak || Spacewatch || — || align=right data-sort-value="0.66" | 660 m || 
|-id=781 bgcolor=#fefefe
| 436781 ||  || — || October 14, 2009 || Mount Lemmon || Mount Lemmon Survey || V || align=right data-sort-value="0.62" | 620 m || 
|-id=782 bgcolor=#fefefe
| 436782 ||  || — || January 27, 2007 || Mount Lemmon || Mount Lemmon Survey || — || align=right data-sort-value="0.73" | 730 m || 
|-id=783 bgcolor=#fefefe
| 436783 ||  || — || November 11, 2009 || Kitt Peak || Spacewatch || — || align=right data-sort-value="0.73" | 730 m || 
|-id=784 bgcolor=#fefefe
| 436784 ||  || — || March 10, 2007 || Mount Lemmon || Mount Lemmon Survey || — || align=right data-sort-value="0.72" | 720 m || 
|-id=785 bgcolor=#fefefe
| 436785 ||  || — || October 6, 2005 || Kitt Peak || Spacewatch || — || align=right data-sort-value="0.72" | 720 m || 
|-id=786 bgcolor=#E9E9E9
| 436786 ||  || — || January 6, 2006 || Kitt Peak || Spacewatch || — || align=right data-sort-value="0.90" | 900 m || 
|-id=787 bgcolor=#fefefe
| 436787 ||  || — || September 14, 2005 || Catalina || CSS || — || align=right data-sort-value="0.90" | 900 m || 
|-id=788 bgcolor=#E9E9E9
| 436788 ||  || — || September 19, 2003 || Kitt Peak || Spacewatch || — || align=right | 1.7 km || 
|-id=789 bgcolor=#E9E9E9
| 436789 ||  || — || March 27, 2011 || Mount Lemmon || Mount Lemmon Survey || (1547) || align=right | 1.9 km || 
|-id=790 bgcolor=#fefefe
| 436790 ||  || — || August 31, 2005 || Anderson Mesa || LONEOS || — || align=right data-sort-value="0.89" | 890 m || 
|-id=791 bgcolor=#fefefe
| 436791 ||  || — || December 5, 2002 || Socorro || LINEAR || — || align=right data-sort-value="0.88" | 880 m || 
|-id=792 bgcolor=#fefefe
| 436792 ||  || — || June 2, 2008 || Mount Lemmon || Mount Lemmon Survey || MAS || align=right data-sort-value="0.82" | 820 m || 
|-id=793 bgcolor=#fefefe
| 436793 ||  || — || September 28, 1994 || Kitt Peak || Spacewatch || — || align=right data-sort-value="0.79" | 790 m || 
|-id=794 bgcolor=#E9E9E9
| 436794 ||  || — || November 30, 2000 || Kitt Peak || Spacewatch || — || align=right | 1.2 km || 
|-id=795 bgcolor=#E9E9E9
| 436795 ||  || — || October 24, 2008 || Catalina || CSS || — || align=right | 1.2 km || 
|-id=796 bgcolor=#E9E9E9
| 436796 ||  || — || January 16, 2005 || Kitt Peak || Spacewatch || EUN || align=right | 1.3 km || 
|-id=797 bgcolor=#fefefe
| 436797 ||  || — || July 6, 1997 || Caussols || ODAS || — || align=right data-sort-value="0.66" | 660 m || 
|-id=798 bgcolor=#fefefe
| 436798 ||  || — || July 5, 2005 || Kitt Peak || Spacewatch || — || align=right data-sort-value="0.45" | 450 m || 
|-id=799 bgcolor=#fefefe
| 436799 ||  || — || September 14, 2005 || Kitt Peak || Spacewatch || (2076) || align=right data-sort-value="0.78" | 780 m || 
|-id=800 bgcolor=#E9E9E9
| 436800 ||  || — || March 2, 2006 || Kitt Peak || Spacewatch || — || align=right | 1.4 km || 
|}

436801–436900 

|-bgcolor=#fefefe
| 436801 ||  || — || May 31, 2008 || Mount Lemmon || Mount Lemmon Survey || — || align=right data-sort-value="0.92" | 920 m || 
|-id=802 bgcolor=#FA8072
| 436802 ||  || — || October 24, 2009 || Kitt Peak || Spacewatch || — || align=right data-sort-value="0.62" | 620 m || 
|-id=803 bgcolor=#E9E9E9
| 436803 ||  || — || September 23, 2008 || Kitt Peak || Spacewatch || EUN || align=right | 1.3 km || 
|-id=804 bgcolor=#fefefe
| 436804 ||  || — || March 9, 2007 || Mount Lemmon || Mount Lemmon Survey || — || align=right data-sort-value="0.87" | 870 m || 
|-id=805 bgcolor=#fefefe
| 436805 ||  || — || October 4, 2002 || Socorro || LINEAR || — || align=right data-sort-value="0.80" | 800 m || 
|-id=806 bgcolor=#fefefe
| 436806 ||  || — || October 12, 2005 || Kitt Peak || Spacewatch || — || align=right data-sort-value="0.75" | 750 m || 
|-id=807 bgcolor=#fefefe
| 436807 ||  || — || March 10, 2007 || Mount Lemmon || Mount Lemmon Survey || — || align=right data-sort-value="0.87" | 870 m || 
|-id=808 bgcolor=#fefefe
| 436808 ||  || — || May 28, 2008 || Mount Lemmon || Mount Lemmon Survey || NYS || align=right data-sort-value="0.77" | 770 m || 
|-id=809 bgcolor=#fefefe
| 436809 ||  || — || October 28, 1994 || Kitt Peak || Spacewatch || — || align=right data-sort-value="0.81" | 810 m || 
|-id=810 bgcolor=#fefefe
| 436810 ||  || — || October 23, 2005 || Catalina || CSS || — || align=right data-sort-value="0.96" | 960 m || 
|-id=811 bgcolor=#d6d6d6
| 436811 ||  || — || April 30, 2011 || Mount Lemmon || Mount Lemmon Survey || BRA || align=right | 2.0 km || 
|-id=812 bgcolor=#fefefe
| 436812 ||  || — || April 23, 2001 || Kitt Peak || Spacewatch || — || align=right data-sort-value="0.78" | 780 m || 
|-id=813 bgcolor=#fefefe
| 436813 ||  || — || October 13, 2005 || Kitt Peak || Spacewatch || — || align=right | 1.1 km || 
|-id=814 bgcolor=#E9E9E9
| 436814 ||  || — || September 3, 2008 || Kitt Peak || Spacewatch || — || align=right | 1.4 km || 
|-id=815 bgcolor=#E9E9E9
| 436815 ||  || — || September 14, 2012 || Kitt Peak || Spacewatch || — || align=right | 1.1 km || 
|-id=816 bgcolor=#d6d6d6
| 436816 ||  || — || September 14, 2012 || Kitt Peak || Spacewatch || EOS || align=right | 2.0 km || 
|-id=817 bgcolor=#E9E9E9
| 436817 ||  || — || September 15, 2012 || Mount Lemmon || Mount Lemmon Survey || — || align=right | 2.3 km || 
|-id=818 bgcolor=#fefefe
| 436818 ||  || — || July 30, 2008 || Mount Lemmon || Mount Lemmon Survey || — || align=right data-sort-value="0.77" | 770 m || 
|-id=819 bgcolor=#fefefe
| 436819 ||  || — || September 18, 2001 || Anderson Mesa || LONEOS || (5026) || align=right data-sort-value="0.78" | 780 m || 
|-id=820 bgcolor=#E9E9E9
| 436820 ||  || — || September 11, 2004 || Socorro || LINEAR || — || align=right | 1.2 km || 
|-id=821 bgcolor=#fefefe
| 436821 ||  || — || September 12, 2001 || Socorro || LINEAR || NYS || align=right data-sort-value="0.76" | 760 m || 
|-id=822 bgcolor=#fefefe
| 436822 ||  || — || October 9, 1999 || Kitt Peak || Spacewatch || — || align=right data-sort-value="0.62" | 620 m || 
|-id=823 bgcolor=#fefefe
| 436823 ||  || — || May 13, 2004 || Kitt Peak || Spacewatch || — || align=right data-sort-value="0.80" | 800 m || 
|-id=824 bgcolor=#fefefe
| 436824 ||  || — || August 13, 2012 || Kitt Peak || Spacewatch || — || align=right data-sort-value="0.84" | 840 m || 
|-id=825 bgcolor=#d6d6d6
| 436825 ||  || — || September 15, 2012 || Kitt Peak || Spacewatch ||  || align=right | 3.2 km || 
|-id=826 bgcolor=#E9E9E9
| 436826 ||  || — || December 5, 2008 || Kitt Peak || Spacewatch || — || align=right | 2.0 km || 
|-id=827 bgcolor=#fefefe
| 436827 ||  || — || April 22, 2007 || Mount Lemmon || Mount Lemmon Survey || V || align=right data-sort-value="0.87" | 870 m || 
|-id=828 bgcolor=#fefefe
| 436828 ||  || — || December 31, 2005 || Kitt Peak || Spacewatch || — || align=right data-sort-value="0.70" | 700 m || 
|-id=829 bgcolor=#E9E9E9
| 436829 ||  || — || August 10, 2007 || Kitt Peak || Spacewatch || — || align=right | 1.9 km || 
|-id=830 bgcolor=#E9E9E9
| 436830 ||  || — || October 1, 2008 || Kitt Peak || Spacewatch || — || align=right | 1.5 km || 
|-id=831 bgcolor=#d6d6d6
| 436831 ||  || — || February 17, 2010 || Kitt Peak || Spacewatch || TEL || align=right | 1.4 km || 
|-id=832 bgcolor=#E9E9E9
| 436832 ||  || — || September 15, 2012 || Catalina || CSS || — || align=right | 1.5 km || 
|-id=833 bgcolor=#E9E9E9
| 436833 ||  || — || March 17, 2010 || Kitt Peak || Spacewatch || — || align=right | 2.2 km || 
|-id=834 bgcolor=#E9E9E9
| 436834 ||  || — || October 23, 2003 || Kitt Peak || Spacewatch || — || align=right | 2.3 km || 
|-id=835 bgcolor=#E9E9E9
| 436835 ||  || — || October 21, 1995 || Kitt Peak || Spacewatch || — || align=right | 2.0 km || 
|-id=836 bgcolor=#fefefe
| 436836 ||  || — || April 5, 2011 || Mount Lemmon || Mount Lemmon Survey || MAS || align=right data-sort-value="0.69" | 690 m || 
|-id=837 bgcolor=#d6d6d6
| 436837 ||  || — || September 17, 2012 || Kitt Peak || Spacewatch || — || align=right | 2.4 km || 
|-id=838 bgcolor=#fefefe
| 436838 ||  || — || September 7, 2008 || Mount Lemmon || Mount Lemmon Survey || — || align=right data-sort-value="0.80" | 800 m || 
|-id=839 bgcolor=#E9E9E9
| 436839 ||  || — || September 1, 1998 || Kitt Peak || Spacewatch || GEF || align=right | 1.4 km || 
|-id=840 bgcolor=#E9E9E9
| 436840 ||  || — || September 17, 2012 || Kitt Peak || Spacewatch || — || align=right | 2.0 km || 
|-id=841 bgcolor=#E9E9E9
| 436841 ||  || — || October 24, 2003 || Kitt Peak || Spacewatch || — || align=right | 2.1 km || 
|-id=842 bgcolor=#d6d6d6
| 436842 ||  || — || September 15, 2006 || Kitt Peak || Spacewatch || — || align=right | 3.0 km || 
|-id=843 bgcolor=#E9E9E9
| 436843 ||  || — || September 22, 2003 || Kitt Peak || Spacewatch || — || align=right | 2.1 km || 
|-id=844 bgcolor=#d6d6d6
| 436844 ||  || — || September 15, 2007 || Kitt Peak || Spacewatch || — || align=right | 2.7 km || 
|-id=845 bgcolor=#E9E9E9
| 436845 ||  || — || September 17, 2012 || Kitt Peak || Spacewatch || NEM || align=right | 2.2 km || 
|-id=846 bgcolor=#E9E9E9
| 436846 ||  || — || February 16, 2010 || Kitt Peak || Spacewatch || — || align=right | 1.8 km || 
|-id=847 bgcolor=#E9E9E9
| 436847 ||  || — || April 24, 2006 || Kitt Peak || Spacewatch || — || align=right | 2.1 km || 
|-id=848 bgcolor=#E9E9E9
| 436848 ||  || — || September 27, 2003 || Kitt Peak || Spacewatch || — || align=right | 2.0 km || 
|-id=849 bgcolor=#E9E9E9
| 436849 ||  || — || October 1, 2008 || Kitt Peak || Spacewatch || — || align=right | 1.0 km || 
|-id=850 bgcolor=#fefefe
| 436850 ||  || — || October 14, 2001 || Kitt Peak || Spacewatch || CLA || align=right | 1.9 km || 
|-id=851 bgcolor=#E9E9E9
| 436851 ||  || — || September 30, 2003 || Kitt Peak || Spacewatch || — || align=right | 2.7 km || 
|-id=852 bgcolor=#fefefe
| 436852 ||  || — || October 26, 2005 || Kitt Peak || Spacewatch || — || align=right data-sort-value="0.97" | 970 m || 
|-id=853 bgcolor=#E9E9E9
| 436853 ||  || — || September 23, 2008 || Mount Lemmon || Mount Lemmon Survey || — || align=right | 1.1 km || 
|-id=854 bgcolor=#E9E9E9
| 436854 ||  || — || February 27, 2006 || Kitt Peak || Spacewatch || — || align=right | 1.8 km || 
|-id=855 bgcolor=#E9E9E9
| 436855 ||  || — || September 23, 2012 || Mount Lemmon || Mount Lemmon Survey || AST || align=right | 1.7 km || 
|-id=856 bgcolor=#E9E9E9
| 436856 ||  || — || October 4, 1996 || Kitt Peak || Spacewatch || — || align=right data-sort-value="0.88" | 880 m || 
|-id=857 bgcolor=#E9E9E9
| 436857 ||  || — || September 23, 2008 || Kitt Peak || Spacewatch || (5) || align=right data-sort-value="0.87" | 870 m || 
|-id=858 bgcolor=#E9E9E9
| 436858 ||  || — || September 16, 2012 || Kitt Peak || Spacewatch || — || align=right | 2.8 km || 
|-id=859 bgcolor=#fefefe
| 436859 ||  || — || December 28, 2005 || Mount Lemmon || Mount Lemmon Survey || — || align=right data-sort-value="0.88" | 880 m || 
|-id=860 bgcolor=#fefefe
| 436860 ||  || — || August 31, 2005 || Kitt Peak || Spacewatch || — || align=right data-sort-value="0.54" | 540 m || 
|-id=861 bgcolor=#fefefe
| 436861 ||  || — || November 18, 2001 || Socorro || LINEAR || MAS || align=right data-sort-value="0.78" | 780 m || 
|-id=862 bgcolor=#E9E9E9
| 436862 ||  || — || November 19, 2003 || Anderson Mesa || LONEOS || — || align=right | 2.7 km || 
|-id=863 bgcolor=#fefefe
| 436863 ||  || — || October 4, 1994 || Kitt Peak || Spacewatch || — || align=right data-sort-value="0.72" | 720 m || 
|-id=864 bgcolor=#E9E9E9
| 436864 ||  || — || December 17, 2003 || Kitt Peak || Spacewatch || — || align=right | 2.6 km || 
|-id=865 bgcolor=#fefefe
| 436865 ||  || — || October 22, 2005 || Kitt Peak || Spacewatch || MAS || align=right data-sort-value="0.82" | 820 m || 
|-id=866 bgcolor=#d6d6d6
| 436866 ||  || — || October 6, 2012 || Mount Lemmon || Mount Lemmon Survey || EOS || align=right | 1.9 km || 
|-id=867 bgcolor=#E9E9E9
| 436867 ||  || — || November 1, 2008 || Mount Lemmon || Mount Lemmon Survey || — || align=right | 1.6 km || 
|-id=868 bgcolor=#E9E9E9
| 436868 ||  || — || October 13, 1999 || Socorro || LINEAR || EUN || align=right | 1.2 km || 
|-id=869 bgcolor=#FA8072
| 436869 ||  || — || July 6, 2005 || Siding Spring || SSS || — || align=right data-sort-value="0.83" | 830 m || 
|-id=870 bgcolor=#d6d6d6
| 436870 ||  || — || October 12, 2007 || Mount Lemmon || Mount Lemmon Survey || KOR || align=right | 1.3 km || 
|-id=871 bgcolor=#fefefe
| 436871 ||  || — || September 21, 2008 || Mount Lemmon || Mount Lemmon Survey || NYS || align=right data-sort-value="0.67" | 670 m || 
|-id=872 bgcolor=#fefefe
| 436872 ||  || — || October 22, 2005 || Kitt Peak || Spacewatch || — || align=right data-sort-value="0.71" | 710 m || 
|-id=873 bgcolor=#E9E9E9
| 436873 ||  || — || October 1, 2003 || Kitt Peak || Spacewatch || — || align=right | 1.8 km || 
|-id=874 bgcolor=#E9E9E9
| 436874 ||  || — || October 6, 1999 || Socorro || LINEAR || — || align=right | 1.7 km || 
|-id=875 bgcolor=#E9E9E9
| 436875 ||  || — || October 6, 2008 || Mount Lemmon || Mount Lemmon Survey || — || align=right | 1.8 km || 
|-id=876 bgcolor=#E9E9E9
| 436876 ||  || — || October 8, 2012 || Mount Lemmon || Mount Lemmon Survey || — || align=right | 1.6 km || 
|-id=877 bgcolor=#fefefe
| 436877 ||  || — || June 19, 2004 || Kitt Peak || Spacewatch || SUL || align=right | 2.4 km || 
|-id=878 bgcolor=#E9E9E9
| 436878 ||  || — || October 6, 2008 || Kitt Peak || Spacewatch || — || align=right | 1.2 km || 
|-id=879 bgcolor=#E9E9E9
| 436879 ||  || — || September 16, 2003 || Kitt Peak || Spacewatch || — || align=right | 2.0 km || 
|-id=880 bgcolor=#fefefe
| 436880 ||  || — || December 4, 2005 || Kitt Peak || Spacewatch || — || align=right data-sort-value="0.80" | 800 m || 
|-id=881 bgcolor=#E9E9E9
| 436881 ||  || — || October 6, 2012 || Mount Lemmon || Mount Lemmon Survey || — || align=right | 2.3 km || 
|-id=882 bgcolor=#E9E9E9
| 436882 ||  || — || September 28, 2003 || Kitt Peak || Spacewatch || — || align=right | 1.8 km || 
|-id=883 bgcolor=#E9E9E9
| 436883 ||  || — || September 15, 2007 || Kitt Peak || Spacewatch || — || align=right | 1.9 km || 
|-id=884 bgcolor=#E9E9E9
| 436884 ||  || — || April 9, 2010 || Mount Lemmon || Mount Lemmon Survey || — || align=right | 2.0 km || 
|-id=885 bgcolor=#E9E9E9
| 436885 ||  || — || September 23, 2008 || Kitt Peak || Spacewatch || EUN || align=right data-sort-value="0.93" | 930 m || 
|-id=886 bgcolor=#fefefe
| 436886 ||  || — || July 30, 2008 || Mount Lemmon || Mount Lemmon Survey || MAS || align=right data-sort-value="0.68" | 680 m || 
|-id=887 bgcolor=#E9E9E9
| 436887 ||  || — || September 16, 2003 || Kitt Peak || Spacewatch || — || align=right | 1.5 km || 
|-id=888 bgcolor=#d6d6d6
| 436888 ||  || — || October 6, 2012 || Mount Lemmon || Mount Lemmon Survey || — || align=right | 3.2 km || 
|-id=889 bgcolor=#E9E9E9
| 436889 ||  || — || March 24, 2006 || Mount Lemmon || Mount Lemmon Survey || — || align=right | 1.8 km || 
|-id=890 bgcolor=#d6d6d6
| 436890 ||  || — || February 20, 2009 || Catalina || CSS || — || align=right | 3.6 km || 
|-id=891 bgcolor=#E9E9E9
| 436891 ||  || — || April 7, 2010 || WISE || WISE || — || align=right | 3.8 km || 
|-id=892 bgcolor=#d6d6d6
| 436892 ||  || — || October 8, 2012 || Mount Lemmon || Mount Lemmon Survey || — || align=right | 2.9 km || 
|-id=893 bgcolor=#d6d6d6
| 436893 ||  || — || December 22, 2008 || Kitt Peak || Spacewatch || KOR || align=right | 1.3 km || 
|-id=894 bgcolor=#E9E9E9
| 436894 ||  || — || October 20, 2008 || Mount Lemmon || Mount Lemmon Survey || — || align=right | 1.3 km || 
|-id=895 bgcolor=#d6d6d6
| 436895 ||  || — || August 23, 2007 || Kitt Peak || Spacewatch || — || align=right | 2.0 km || 
|-id=896 bgcolor=#E9E9E9
| 436896 ||  || — || September 22, 2003 || Kitt Peak || Spacewatch || — || align=right | 1.9 km || 
|-id=897 bgcolor=#E9E9E9
| 436897 ||  || — || December 15, 2004 || Kitt Peak || Spacewatch || (5) || align=right data-sort-value="0.86" | 860 m || 
|-id=898 bgcolor=#d6d6d6
| 436898 ||  || — || September 15, 2012 || Kitt Peak || Spacewatch || — || align=right | 2.6 km || 
|-id=899 bgcolor=#E9E9E9
| 436899 ||  || — || October 26, 2008 || Kitt Peak || Spacewatch || — || align=right | 1.3 km || 
|-id=900 bgcolor=#E9E9E9
| 436900 ||  || — || August 28, 2012 || Mount Lemmon || Mount Lemmon Survey || AEO || align=right | 1.2 km || 
|}

436901–437000 

|-bgcolor=#fefefe
| 436901 ||  || — || March 30, 2011 || Mount Lemmon || Mount Lemmon Survey || (5026) || align=right data-sort-value="0.80" | 800 m || 
|-id=902 bgcolor=#d6d6d6
| 436902 ||  || — || October 8, 2012 || Mount Lemmon || Mount Lemmon Survey || — || align=right | 3.3 km || 
|-id=903 bgcolor=#d6d6d6
| 436903 ||  || — || July 25, 2006 || Mount Lemmon || Mount Lemmon Survey || — || align=right | 2.9 km || 
|-id=904 bgcolor=#E9E9E9
| 436904 ||  || — || November 16, 2003 || Kitt Peak || Spacewatch || — || align=right | 2.3 km || 
|-id=905 bgcolor=#E9E9E9
| 436905 ||  || — || September 28, 2003 || Kitt Peak || Spacewatch || — || align=right | 2.1 km || 
|-id=906 bgcolor=#E9E9E9
| 436906 ||  || — || September 5, 2007 || Mount Lemmon || Mount Lemmon Survey || AGN || align=right | 1.1 km || 
|-id=907 bgcolor=#d6d6d6
| 436907 ||  || — || October 19, 2006 || Catalina || CSS || URS || align=right | 2.9 km || 
|-id=908 bgcolor=#fefefe
| 436908 ||  || — || September 29, 1997 || Kitt Peak || Spacewatch || critical || align=right data-sort-value="0.62" | 620 m || 
|-id=909 bgcolor=#d6d6d6
| 436909 ||  || — || October 9, 2007 || Kitt Peak || Spacewatch || — || align=right | 2.6 km || 
|-id=910 bgcolor=#d6d6d6
| 436910 ||  || — || May 5, 2010 || Mount Lemmon || Mount Lemmon Survey || — || align=right | 3.6 km || 
|-id=911 bgcolor=#E9E9E9
| 436911 ||  || — || September 19, 2003 || Kitt Peak || Spacewatch || — || align=right | 2.5 km || 
|-id=912 bgcolor=#fefefe
| 436912 ||  || — || December 24, 2005 || Kitt Peak || Spacewatch || — || align=right data-sort-value="0.85" | 850 m || 
|-id=913 bgcolor=#d6d6d6
| 436913 ||  || — || September 13, 2007 || Mount Lemmon || Mount Lemmon Survey || KOR || align=right | 1.2 km || 
|-id=914 bgcolor=#E9E9E9
| 436914 ||  || — || November 1, 2008 || Mount Lemmon || Mount Lemmon Survey || — || align=right | 1.5 km || 
|-id=915 bgcolor=#fefefe
| 436915 ||  || — || March 13, 2011 || Mount Lemmon || Mount Lemmon Survey || — || align=right data-sort-value="0.92" | 920 m || 
|-id=916 bgcolor=#d6d6d6
| 436916 ||  || — || September 16, 2012 || Kitt Peak || Spacewatch || EOS || align=right | 2.3 km || 
|-id=917 bgcolor=#E9E9E9
| 436917 ||  || — || September 22, 2008 || Kitt Peak || Spacewatch || — || align=right | 1.4 km || 
|-id=918 bgcolor=#E9E9E9
| 436918 ||  || — || October 8, 2012 || Kitt Peak || Spacewatch || — || align=right | 2.4 km || 
|-id=919 bgcolor=#E9E9E9
| 436919 ||  || — || September 4, 2008 || Kitt Peak || Spacewatch || — || align=right | 1.8 km || 
|-id=920 bgcolor=#fefefe
| 436920 ||  || — || October 4, 1997 || Kitt Peak || Spacewatch || — || align=right data-sort-value="0.75" | 750 m || 
|-id=921 bgcolor=#E9E9E9
| 436921 ||  || — || October 21, 2008 || Kitt Peak || Spacewatch || (5) || align=right data-sort-value="0.96" | 960 m || 
|-id=922 bgcolor=#fefefe
| 436922 ||  || — || August 15, 1993 || Kitt Peak || Spacewatch || critical || align=right data-sort-value="0.71" | 710 m || 
|-id=923 bgcolor=#E9E9E9
| 436923 ||  || — || October 21, 2003 || Kitt Peak || Spacewatch || — || align=right | 2.3 km || 
|-id=924 bgcolor=#FA8072
| 436924 ||  || — || September 29, 2005 || Kitt Peak || Spacewatch || critical || align=right data-sort-value="0.49" | 490 m || 
|-id=925 bgcolor=#d6d6d6
| 436925 ||  || — || September 15, 2007 || Mount Lemmon || Mount Lemmon Survey || EOS || align=right | 1.9 km || 
|-id=926 bgcolor=#d6d6d6
| 436926 ||  || — || October 9, 2012 || Mount Lemmon || Mount Lemmon Survey || — || align=right | 4.7 km || 
|-id=927 bgcolor=#E9E9E9
| 436927 ||  || — || October 10, 2012 || Mount Lemmon || Mount Lemmon Survey || — || align=right | 2.3 km || 
|-id=928 bgcolor=#d6d6d6
| 436928 ||  || — || September 21, 2012 || Kitt Peak || Spacewatch || — || align=right | 3.0 km || 
|-id=929 bgcolor=#E9E9E9
| 436929 ||  || — || October 10, 2007 || Mount Lemmon || Mount Lemmon Survey || — || align=right | 2.0 km || 
|-id=930 bgcolor=#d6d6d6
| 436930 ||  || — || September 21, 2012 || Kitt Peak || Spacewatch || — || align=right | 3.2 km || 
|-id=931 bgcolor=#E9E9E9
| 436931 ||  || — || October 1, 2003 || Kitt Peak || Spacewatch || — || align=right | 2.5 km || 
|-id=932 bgcolor=#E9E9E9
| 436932 ||  || — || December 7, 2008 || Mount Lemmon || Mount Lemmon Survey || — || align=right | 1.7 km || 
|-id=933 bgcolor=#E9E9E9
| 436933 ||  || — || May 28, 2003 || Kitt Peak || Spacewatch || — || align=right | 1.0 km || 
|-id=934 bgcolor=#fefefe
| 436934 ||  || — || November 20, 2001 || Socorro || LINEAR || NYS || align=right data-sort-value="0.83" | 830 m || 
|-id=935 bgcolor=#fefefe
| 436935 ||  || — || December 25, 2005 || Kitt Peak || Spacewatch || — || align=right | 1.2 km || 
|-id=936 bgcolor=#d6d6d6
| 436936 ||  || — || April 11, 2005 || Mount Lemmon || Mount Lemmon Survey || — || align=right | 2.4 km || 
|-id=937 bgcolor=#E9E9E9
| 436937 ||  || — || September 27, 2003 || Kitt Peak || Spacewatch || — || align=right | 2.1 km || 
|-id=938 bgcolor=#d6d6d6
| 436938 ||  || — || October 8, 2012 || Mount Lemmon || Mount Lemmon Survey || — || align=right | 3.4 km || 
|-id=939 bgcolor=#E9E9E9
| 436939 ||  || — || August 18, 2007 || XuYi || PMO NEO || — || align=right | 2.9 km || 
|-id=940 bgcolor=#E9E9E9
| 436940 ||  || — || October 21, 2003 || Kitt Peak || Spacewatch || — || align=right | 3.9 km || 
|-id=941 bgcolor=#d6d6d6
| 436941 ||  || — || March 15, 2004 || Kitt Peak || Spacewatch || EOS || align=right | 1.7 km || 
|-id=942 bgcolor=#E9E9E9
| 436942 ||  || — || October 8, 2008 || Mount Lemmon || Mount Lemmon Survey || — || align=right | 1.5 km || 
|-id=943 bgcolor=#E9E9E9
| 436943 ||  || — || March 18, 2010 || Mount Lemmon || Mount Lemmon Survey || AGN || align=right | 1.00 km || 
|-id=944 bgcolor=#E9E9E9
| 436944 ||  || — || November 3, 2008 || Kitt Peak || Spacewatch || — || align=right | 2.4 km || 
|-id=945 bgcolor=#E9E9E9
| 436945 ||  || — || October 10, 2004 || Kitt Peak || Spacewatch || — || align=right data-sort-value="0.92" | 920 m || 
|-id=946 bgcolor=#E9E9E9
| 436946 ||  || — || October 29, 2008 || Kitt Peak || Spacewatch || — || align=right | 1.4 km || 
|-id=947 bgcolor=#FA8072
| 436947 ||  || — || October 30, 2005 || Catalina || CSS || — || align=right data-sort-value="0.94" | 940 m || 
|-id=948 bgcolor=#E9E9E9
| 436948 ||  || — || September 11, 2012 || Siding Spring || SSS || (5) || align=right data-sort-value="0.92" | 920 m || 
|-id=949 bgcolor=#fefefe
| 436949 ||  || — || August 4, 2008 || Siding Spring || SSS || — || align=right | 1.1 km || 
|-id=950 bgcolor=#E9E9E9
| 436950 ||  || — || September 25, 2012 || Catalina || CSS || NEM || align=right | 2.2 km || 
|-id=951 bgcolor=#d6d6d6
| 436951 ||  || — || October 16, 2001 || Kitt Peak || Spacewatch || — || align=right | 2.7 km || 
|-id=952 bgcolor=#d6d6d6
| 436952 ||  || — || December 4, 2007 || Mount Lemmon || Mount Lemmon Survey || — || align=right | 2.3 km || 
|-id=953 bgcolor=#E9E9E9
| 436953 ||  || — || May 24, 2011 || Mount Lemmon || Mount Lemmon Survey || (5) || align=right data-sort-value="0.75" | 750 m || 
|-id=954 bgcolor=#E9E9E9
| 436954 ||  || — || September 13, 2007 || Mount Lemmon || Mount Lemmon Survey || AGN || align=right | 1.00 km || 
|-id=955 bgcolor=#E9E9E9
| 436955 ||  || — || September 13, 2007 || Mount Lemmon || Mount Lemmon Survey || — || align=right | 2.1 km || 
|-id=956 bgcolor=#d6d6d6
| 436956 ||  || — || September 17, 2012 || Kitt Peak || Spacewatch || — || align=right | 3.1 km || 
|-id=957 bgcolor=#E9E9E9
| 436957 ||  || — || October 1, 2003 || Kitt Peak || Spacewatch || — || align=right | 2.0 km || 
|-id=958 bgcolor=#d6d6d6
| 436958 ||  || — || January 27, 2010 || WISE || WISE || VER || align=right | 2.4 km || 
|-id=959 bgcolor=#E9E9E9
| 436959 ||  || — || October 26, 2008 || Mount Lemmon || Mount Lemmon Survey || — || align=right | 1.5 km || 
|-id=960 bgcolor=#d6d6d6
| 436960 ||  || — || October 14, 2007 || Mount Lemmon || Mount Lemmon Survey || EOS || align=right | 1.8 km || 
|-id=961 bgcolor=#d6d6d6
| 436961 ||  || — || February 20, 2009 || Kitt Peak || Spacewatch || — || align=right | 2.7 km || 
|-id=962 bgcolor=#d6d6d6
| 436962 ||  || — || September 13, 2007 || Mount Lemmon || Mount Lemmon Survey || KOR || align=right | 1.1 km || 
|-id=963 bgcolor=#fefefe
| 436963 ||  || — || December 6, 2005 || Kitt Peak || Spacewatch || — || align=right | 1.2 km || 
|-id=964 bgcolor=#E9E9E9
| 436964 ||  || — || June 25, 2010 || WISE || WISE || PAD || align=right | 2.3 km || 
|-id=965 bgcolor=#d6d6d6
| 436965 ||  || — || April 11, 2010 || Kitt Peak || Spacewatch || — || align=right | 2.0 km || 
|-id=966 bgcolor=#E9E9E9
| 436966 ||  || — || March 12, 2010 || Kitt Peak || Spacewatch || — || align=right | 1.9 km || 
|-id=967 bgcolor=#d6d6d6
| 436967 ||  || — || August 28, 2006 || Kitt Peak || Spacewatch || — || align=right | 2.8 km || 
|-id=968 bgcolor=#E9E9E9
| 436968 ||  || — || October 2, 2008 || Kitt Peak || Spacewatch || — || align=right data-sort-value="0.96" | 960 m || 
|-id=969 bgcolor=#d6d6d6
| 436969 ||  || — || November 7, 2007 || Kitt Peak || Spacewatch || — || align=right | 2.3 km || 
|-id=970 bgcolor=#E9E9E9
| 436970 ||  || — || October 22, 2003 || Kitt Peak || Spacewatch || — || align=right | 2.4 km || 
|-id=971 bgcolor=#d6d6d6
| 436971 ||  || — || September 11, 2007 || Mount Lemmon || Mount Lemmon Survey || KOR || align=right | 1.4 km || 
|-id=972 bgcolor=#fefefe
| 436972 ||  || — || April 26, 2000 || Kitt Peak || Spacewatch || NYS || align=right data-sort-value="0.60" | 600 m || 
|-id=973 bgcolor=#fefefe
| 436973 ||  || — || September 5, 2008 || Kitt Peak || Spacewatch || — || align=right data-sort-value="0.86" | 860 m || 
|-id=974 bgcolor=#d6d6d6
| 436974 ||  || — || May 6, 2010 || Mount Lemmon || Mount Lemmon Survey || EOS || align=right | 2.0 km || 
|-id=975 bgcolor=#d6d6d6
| 436975 ||  || — || October 9, 2012 || Mount Lemmon || Mount Lemmon Survey || VER || align=right | 2.6 km || 
|-id=976 bgcolor=#d6d6d6
| 436976 ||  || — || October 10, 2012 || Kitt Peak || Spacewatch || THM || align=right | 2.1 km || 
|-id=977 bgcolor=#E9E9E9
| 436977 ||  || — || April 23, 2007 || Kitt Peak || Spacewatch || — || align=right | 1.4 km || 
|-id=978 bgcolor=#fefefe
| 436978 ||  || — || November 4, 2005 || Kitt Peak || Spacewatch || — || align=right | 2.3 km || 
|-id=979 bgcolor=#d6d6d6
| 436979 ||  || — || September 20, 2006 || Kitt Peak || Spacewatch || VER || align=right | 2.5 km || 
|-id=980 bgcolor=#E9E9E9
| 436980 ||  || — || November 19, 2008 || Mount Lemmon || Mount Lemmon Survey || AGN || align=right | 1.3 km || 
|-id=981 bgcolor=#d6d6d6
| 436981 ||  || — || October 4, 2007 || Kitt Peak || Spacewatch || EOS || align=right | 1.8 km || 
|-id=982 bgcolor=#fefefe
| 436982 ||  || — || November 4, 2005 || Kitt Peak || Spacewatch || MAS || align=right data-sort-value="0.75" | 750 m || 
|-id=983 bgcolor=#fefefe
| 436983 ||  || — || October 26, 2005 || Kitt Peak || Spacewatch || NYS || align=right data-sort-value="0.69" | 690 m || 
|-id=984 bgcolor=#E9E9E9
| 436984 ||  || — || December 19, 2009 || Mount Lemmon || Mount Lemmon Survey || — || align=right | 2.4 km || 
|-id=985 bgcolor=#d6d6d6
| 436985 ||  || — || September 15, 2006 || Kitt Peak || Spacewatch || — || align=right | 3.2 km || 
|-id=986 bgcolor=#d6d6d6
| 436986 ||  || — || December 21, 2008 || Kitt Peak || Spacewatch ||  || align=right | 2.4 km || 
|-id=987 bgcolor=#d6d6d6
| 436987 ||  || — || February 20, 2009 || Mount Lemmon || Mount Lemmon Survey || — || align=right | 2.9 km || 
|-id=988 bgcolor=#E9E9E9
| 436988 ||  || — || October 11, 2012 || Kitt Peak || Spacewatch || WIT || align=right data-sort-value="0.97" | 970 m || 
|-id=989 bgcolor=#fefefe
| 436989 ||  || — || October 20, 1997 || Xinglong || SCAP || — || align=right data-sort-value="0.81" | 810 m || 
|-id=990 bgcolor=#E9E9E9
| 436990 ||  || — || October 17, 2003 || Kitt Peak || Spacewatch || — || align=right | 2.5 km || 
|-id=991 bgcolor=#d6d6d6
| 436991 ||  || — || January 26, 2010 || WISE || WISE || — || align=right | 3.3 km || 
|-id=992 bgcolor=#fefefe
| 436992 ||  || — || December 23, 2001 || Kitt Peak || Spacewatch || — || align=right data-sort-value="0.71" | 710 m || 
|-id=993 bgcolor=#E9E9E9
| 436993 ||  || — || October 18, 2003 || Kitt Peak || Spacewatch || — || align=right | 2.5 km || 
|-id=994 bgcolor=#E9E9E9
| 436994 ||  || — || September 22, 2003 || Kitt Peak || Spacewatch || — || align=right | 2.1 km || 
|-id=995 bgcolor=#fefefe
| 436995 ||  || — || October 12, 2005 || Kitt Peak || Spacewatch || — || align=right data-sort-value="0.82" | 820 m || 
|-id=996 bgcolor=#E9E9E9
| 436996 ||  || — || September 26, 2008 || Kitt Peak || Spacewatch || — || align=right | 1.2 km || 
|-id=997 bgcolor=#FA8072
| 436997 ||  || — || September 15, 2012 || Kitt Peak || Spacewatch || — || align=right data-sort-value="0.81" | 810 m || 
|-id=998 bgcolor=#E9E9E9
| 436998 ||  || — || August 10, 2007 || Kitt Peak || Spacewatch || — || align=right | 2.1 km || 
|-id=999 bgcolor=#E9E9E9
| 436999 ||  || — || September 24, 2008 || Kitt Peak || Spacewatch || EUN || align=right | 1.1 km || 
|-id=000 bgcolor=#E9E9E9
| 437000 ||  || — || October 18, 2003 || Kitt Peak || Spacewatch || AGN || align=right | 1.1 km || 
|}

References

External links 
 Discovery Circumstances: Numbered Minor Planets (435001)–(440000) (IAU Minor Planet Center)

0436